= Breeders Crown 2YO Colt & Gelding Trot =

- Location: United States & Canada
- Inaugurated: 1984
- Race type: Harness race for Standardbred trotters

Race information
- Distance: 1 mile (1,609 metres or 8 furlongs)
- Surface: Dirt
- Track: various
- Qualification: 2-year-old colts & geldings
- Purse: $600,000 (2016)

The Breeders 2YO Colt & Gelding Trot is a harness racing event for two-year-old Standardbred male trotters. It is one part of the Breeders Crown annual series of twelve races for both Standardbred trotters and pacers. First run in 1985, it is contested over a distance of one mile. Race organizers have awarded the event to various racetracks across North America. The 2017 race will be held at Hoosier Park in Anderson, Indiana, United States.

== Historical race events ==
On October 5, 1984 at The Red Mile in Lexington, Kentucky, Workaholic became the first ever Breeders Crown champion when he won the run-off for the 2YO Colt & Gelding Trot. Owned by an American racing partnership headed by Paul Heineken & Paul Ewell of Ocean City, Maryland, Workaholic was driven and trained by Swedes Berndt Lindstedt and Jan Johnson.

In 2010, Pocono Downs became the first venue to host all 12 events on a single night.

== North American Locations ==
- Woodbine Racetrack (Wdb) Ontario (9)
- Pompano Park (Ppk) Florida (7)
- Meadowlands Racetrack (Mxx) New Jersey (6)
- Mohawk Raceway (Moh) Ontario (5)
- Garden State Park (Gsp) New Jersey (1)
- Pocono Downs (Pcd) Pennsylvania (2)
- Colonial Downs (Cln) Virginia (1)
- The Meadows Racetrack (Mea) Pennsylvania (1)
- The Red Mile (Lex) Kentucky (1)

== Records ==
Most wins by a driver

- 4 – John Campbell (1985, 1986, 1993, 2002)

Most wins by a trainer

- 5 – Jimmy Takter (1996, 2004, 2011, 2013, 2014)

Stakes record

- 1:53 0/0 – Walner (2016)

== Winners of the Breeders Crown 2YO Colt & Gelding Trot ==
Year	Winner	Driver	Trainer	Owner	Time	Purse	Track
2016	Walner	Tim Tetrick	Linda Toscano	Kenneth Jacobs	1:53 0/0	$600,000	Mxx
2015	Southwind Frank	Yannick Gingras	Ron Burke	Burke Rcg Stb, W. Bruscemi, Our Horse Cents Stbs, J&T Silva Stbs	1:54 2/5	$600,000	Wdb
2014	Pinkman	Yannick Gingras	Jimmy Takter	Christina Takter, Joyce McClelland, Herb Liverman	1:53 2/5	$500,000	Mxx
2013	Father Patrick	Yannick Gingras	Jimmy Takter	Father Patrick Stable	1:54 0/0	$500,000	Pcd
2012	Wheeling N Dealin	Sylvain Filion	R. Dustin Jones	Ecurie Synergie	1:56 0/0	$600,000	Wdb
2011	Uncle Peter	Dave Palone	Jimmy Takter	Christina Takter, John D. & Jim H. Fielding, & Falkbolagen AB	1:55 0/0	$600,000	Wdb
2010	Manofmanymissions	Andy Miller	Ervin M. Miller	Maurice Biasuzzi, John Carver & Mystical Marker Farms	1:53 2/5	$600,000	Pcd
2009	Pilgrims Taj	Michel Lachance	Keith Armer	B. Bongiorno, R. P. Heffering, Bix DiMeo & Val d'Or Farms	1:57 1/5	$650,000	Wdb
2008	Muscle Hill	Brian Sears	Greg Peck	Jerry Silva & TLP Stable	1:53 3/5	$700,000	Mxx
2007	Deweycheatumnhowe	Ray Schnittker	Ray Schnittker	R. Schnittker, T. Gewertz, C. V. Iannazzo & Deweycheatumnhowe Stb	1:57 2/5	$650,000	Mxx
2006	Donato Hanover	Ronald Pierce	Steve Elliott	David B. Scharf, Steven Arnold, Golden Touch Stable	1:56 0/0	$600,000	Wdb
2005	Chocolatier	Douglas J. Ackerman	Douglas J. Ackerman	Doug Ackerman Stable	1:56 1/5	$507,600	Mxx
2004	Ken Warkentin	David Miller	Jimmy Takter	Christina Takter, John D. & Jim H. Fielding, Tie Domi & Windsor Stable	1:57 1/5	$525,900	Wdb
2003	Cantab Hall	Michel Lachance	Ron Gurfein	Brittany Farms, Lindy Racing, Jerry Silva & Sampson Stable	1:56 4/5	$445,000	Mxx
2002	Broadway Hall	John Campbell	Jim Campbell	Jules & Arlene Siegel	1:57 2/5	$525,500	Wdb
2001	Duke Of York	Paul MacDonnell	John Bax	Alexander J. Libfeld, Marvin Katz & Sam Goldband	1:57 3/5	$570,000	Wdb
2000	Banker Hall	Trevor Ritchie	Harald Lunde	Tommy Andersson	1:56 1/5	$543,500	Moh
1999	Master Lavec	Dan Daley	Dan Daley	Ann-Mari Daley & Robert Pergament	1:56 4/5	$525,700	Moh
1998	CR Commando	Carl Allen	Carl Allen	Carl & Rod Allen Stable & Niss Allen	1:53 2/5	$390,700	Cln
1997	Catch As Catch Can	Wally Hennessey	Ron Gurfein	Catch As Catch Can Stable	2:01 1/5	$350,000	Moh
1996	Malabar Man	Malvern C. Burroughs	Jimmy Takter	Malvern C. Burroughs	1:59 1/5	$366,600	Moh
1995	Armbro Officer	Steve Condren	Robert McIntosh	Robert McIntosh, Seymour Grundy & CSX Stables	1:58 3/5	$372,800	Gsp
1994	Eager Seelster	Ted Jacobs	Ted Jacobs	John D. Fielding, Leo & Four Studs Stable	1:58 3/5	$339,100	Wdb
1993	Wesgate Crown	John Campbell	G. R. "Raz" MacKenzie	Simmonds, Guida & Simmonds	1:57 1/5	$300,000	Ppk
1992	Giant Chill	John F. Patterson, Jr.	Per Eriksson	Gewertz & Robins Racing	1:58 2/5	$300,000	Ppk
1991	King Conch	William Gale	Per Eriksson	Thomas Moberg	1:56 2/5	$300,000	Ppk
1990	Crysta's Best	Dick Richardson, Jr.	Dick Richardson, Jr.	Huber, Montgomery, Biddle & Breidenbach	2:01 0/0	$473,870	Ppk
1989	Royal Troubador	Carl Allen	Carl Allen	Carl & Rod Allen Stable	1:59 2/5	$475,213	Ppk
1988	Valley Victory	Bill O'Donnell	Steve Elliott	Arlene Traub	1:58 1/5	$488,219	Ppk
1987	Defiant One	Howard Beissinger	Howard Beissinger	Ann Beissinger & Eva Duringer	2:01 4/5	$428,912	Moh
1986	Mack Lobell	John Campbell	Charles Sylvester	One More Time Stable	1:59 1/5	$496,850	Ppk
1985	Express Ride	John Campbell	George Sholty	Castleton Farm, Hanley Dawson, Jr. & William Simon	2:01 3/5	$474,803	Mea
1984	Workaholic	Berndt O. Lindstedt	Jan Johnson	The Workaholics Partnership (Paul Heineken & Paul Ewell, et al.)	1:57 1/5	$600,750	Lex

== See also ==
- List of Breeders Crown Winners
