= Breeders Crown 2YO Filly Pace =

- Location: North America
- Inaugurated: 1984 (42 years ago)
- Race type: Harness race for Standardbred pacers
- Website: Hambletonian Society, Inc.

Race information
- Distance: 1 mile (1,609 metres or 8 furlongs)
- Surface: Dirt
- Qualification: 2-year-olds
- Purse: $600,000 (2023)

The Breeders Crown 2YO Filly Pace is a harness racing event for two-year-old standardbred filly pacers. It is one part of the Breeders Crown annual series of twelve races for both Standardbred pacers and trotters. First run in 1985, it is contested over a distance of one mile. Race organizers have awarded the event to various racetracks across North America.

== Historical race events ==
In her final start of 2014, JK Shesalady made the Breeders Crown her fourteenth straight victory in an undefeated season and would become the first 2-year-old filly in history to be voted the Dan Patch Harness Horse of the Year Award.

== North American locations ==
- Woodbine Racetrack (Wdb) Ontario (9)
- Meadowlands Racetrack (Mxx) New Jersey (7)
- Mohawk Raceway (Moh) Ontario (6)
- Pompano Park (Ppk) Florida (5)
- Harrah's Hoosier Park (HoP) Indiana (3)
- Pocono Downs (Pcd) Pennsylvania (2)
- Colonial Downs (Cln) Virginia (1)
- Freehold Raceway (Fhl) New Jersey (1)
- Freestate Raceway (Fsr) Maryland (1)
- Garden State Park (Gsp) New Jersey (1)
- Maywood Park (May) Illinois (1)
- Rosecroft Raceway (Rcr) Maryland (1)
- Yonkers Raceway (YR) New York (1)

== Records ==
Most wins by a driver

- 6 – John Campbell (1984, 1988, 1990, 1991, 1992, 1995)

Most wins by a trainer

- 4 – Bruce Nickells (1988, 1990, 1991, 1992)

Stakes record

- 1:49 2/5 – My Girl EJ (2023)

== Winners of the Breeders Crown 2YO Filly Pace ==
Year	Winner	Driver	Trainer	Owner	Time	Purse	Track
2023	My Girl EJ	Dexter Dunn	Ron Burke	Burke Racing Stable, Weaver Bruscemi, Elizabeth Novak, Howard Taylor	1:49 2/5	$700,000	HoP
2022	Sylvia Hanover	Bob McClure	Shawn Steacy	Hudson Standardbred Stable Inc.	1:51 1/5	$600,000	Moh
2021	Niki Hill	Dexter Dunn	Chris Ryder	Tom Hill	1:51 0/0	$600,000	Mxx
2020	Fire Start Hanover	Dexter Dunn	R. Nifty Norman	Pinske Stables, David Hoese and Lawrence Means	1:50 4/5	$600,000	HoP
2019	Reflect with Me	Andrew McCarthy	Tony Alagna	Brittany Farms, Bradley Grant	1:50 3/5	$600,000	Moh
2018	Warrawee Ubeaut	Yannick Gingras	Ron Burke	Burke, Collura, Silva-Purnel Libby & Weaver-Bruscemi	1:52 3/5	$650,000	Pcd
2017	Youaremycandygirl	Yannick Gingras	Ron Burke	William J Donovan	1:53 2/5	$600,000	HoP
2016	Someomensomewhere	Marcus Miller	Ervin Miller	Nick Surick Stable LLC & KDM Stables Corp.	1:51 2/5	$600,000	Mxx
2015	Pure Country	Brett Miller	Jimmy Takter	Diamond Creek Racing	1:51 4/5	$600,000	Wdb
2014	JK Shesalady	Tim Tetrick	Nancy Johansson	3 Brothers Stable (Alan, Ronald & Steven Katz)	1:50 2/5	$500,000	Mxx
2013	Uffizi Hanover	David Miller	Jimmy Takter	Al J. Libfeld, Marv Katz & Sam A. Goldband	1:52 1/5	$500,000	Pcd
2012	Somewhereovrarainbow	Andy Miller	George Teague, Jr.	Teague, Inc, K and R Racing & Theodore Gewertz	1:52 2/5	$600,000	Wdb
2011	Economy Terror	Brian Sears	Chris Oakes	Chuck Pompey, Ed Gold & Howard Taylor	1:51 0/0	$600,000	Wdb
2010	See You At Peelers	Jim Morrill, Jr.	Jimmy Takter	Christina Takter & John & Jim Fielding	1:52 1/5	$600,000	Pcd
2009	Fancy Filly	Brian Sears	Brenda Teague	Teague, Inc, Theodore Gewertz & Only Money Inc.	1:53 4/5	$660,000	Wdb
2008	Fox Valley Topaz	David Miller	Ken Rucker	Engel Stable, Rucker Stable	1:52 4/5	$700,000	Mxx
2007	Stylish Artist	George Brennan	Mark Steacy	Mark Steacy, R. Peter Heffering, David Reid	1:53 0/0	$650,000	Mxx
2006	Calgary Hanover	Michel Lachance	Don Swick	Royal Wire Products Inc. & United Process Control Co.	1:53 2/5	$600,000	Wdb
2005	My Little Dragon	Ronald Pierce	Brendan Johnson	Adam Victor & Son Stable	1:52 1/5	$500,000	Mxx
2004	Restive Hanover	Andy Miller	Ervin Miller	Anthony McEldowney & Starmaker Farm	1:52 4/5	$651,800	Wdb
2003	Pans Culottes	Dan Dubé	Benjamin Wallace	Peter Pan Stables Inc. (Robert Glazer)	1:54 3/5	$470,000	Mxx
2002	Armbro Amoretto	Luc Ouellette	David Smith	Big Al's Stable	1:53 0/0	$572,300	Wdb
2001	Cam Swifty	Jim Meittinis	Don Swick	Royal Wire Products Inc.	1:52 4/5	$550,000	Wdb
2000	Lady MacBeach	Luc Ouellette	Joe Holloway	L & L DeVisser Partnership	1:55 3/5	$524,600	Moh
1999	Eternal Camnation	Eric Ledford	Jeff Miller	James Hardesty	1:52 3/5	$483,900	Moh
1998	Juliet's Fate	George Brennan	Brett Pelling	Southwind Farm	1:52 0/0	$481,800	Cln
1997	Take Flight	Luc Ouellette	Alan Riegle	Brittany Farms	1:54 1/5	$482,000	Moh
1996	Before Sunrise	Steve Condren	Gene Riegle	Brittany Farms & Daisy Acres Partnership	1:55 3/5	$500,800	Moh
1995	Paige Nicole Q	John Campbell	Charles Sylvester	Alan H. Quinn	1:53 4/5	$520,300	Gsp
1994	Yankee Cashmere	Peter Wrenn	Brett Bittle	Charles E. Keller III, Charles E. Keller IV & B. Bittle	1:56 0/0	$427,000	Wdb
1993	Electric Slide	Michel Lachance	Robert McIntosh	Guida Racing Stable	1:55 3/5	$300,000	Fhl
1992	Immortality	John Campbell	Bruce Nickells	Rose Guida & Winning Verdict Stables	1:54 4/5	$300,000	Ppk
1991	Hazleton Kay	John Campbell	Bruce Nickells	Rose Guida & Royal Palm Stables	1:53 4/5	$366,000	Ppk
1990	Miss Easy	John Campbell	Bruce Nickells	Rose Guida & Royal Palm Stables	1:54 0/0	$514,870	Ppk
1989	Town Pro	Doug Brown	Stewart Firlotte	Pro Group Stable	1:55 0/0	$438,213	Ppk
1988	Central Park West	John Campbell	Bruce Nickells	North Woodland Stable & William Perretti	1:53 3/5	$573,219	Ppk
1987	Leah Almahurst	William Fahy	Gene Riegle	Brittany Farms	2:00 1/5	$573,912	Fsr
1986	Halcyon	Ray Remmen	Ray Remmen	Lana Rosenfeld & Seth Rosenfeld	1:58 0/0	$536,100	Rcr
1985	Caressable	Hervé Filion	Billy Haughton	Wall Street Stable II	2:00 0/0	$632,803	YR
1984	Amneris	John Campbell	Sören Nordin	Cedar Farms	1:57 1/5	$555,000	May

== See also ==
- List of Breeders Crown Winners
