= Breeders Crown Open Mare Pace =

- Class: Grade 1
- Location: North America
- Inaugurated: 1986
- Race type: Harness race for Standardbred pacers

Race information
- Distance: 1 mile (1,609 metres or 8 furlongs)
- Surface: Dirt
- Qualification: 4-year-olds-and-up
- Purse: $400,000 (2025)

The Breeders Crown Open Mare Pace is a Grade 1 harness racing event for four-year-old and older Standardbred mare pacers. It is one part of the Breeders Crown annual series of twelve races for both Standardbred pacers and trotters. First run in 1986, it is contested over a distance of one mile. Race organizers have awarded the event to various racetracks across North America.

== North American locations ==
- Meadowlands Racetrack (Mxx) New Jersey (15)
- Mohawk Raceway (Moh) Ontario (8)
- Woodbine Racetrack (Wdb) Ontario (4)
- Pocono Downs (Pcd) Pennsylvania (4)
- Harrah's Hoosier Park (HoP) Indiana (3)
- Northfield Park (Nfl) Ohio (2)
- Freehold Raceway (Fhl) New Jersey (1)
- Pompano Park (Ppk) Florida (1)
- The Meadows Racetrack (Mea) Pennsylvania (1)
- The Red Mile (Lex) Kentucky (1)
- Greenwood Raceway (Grd) Ontario (1)

== Records ==
Most wins by a horse

- 2 – Shady Daisy (1992, 1994), Eternal Camnation (2001, 2003), Androvette (2011, 2012), Shelliscape (2013, 2014)

Most wins by a driver

- 5 – John Campbell (1987, 1996, 1997, 1998, 2014)

Most wins by a trainer

- 3 – Paul J. Fraley (2012, 2013, 2014)

Stakes record

- 1:48 1/5 – Always B Naughty (2025)

== Winners of the Breeders Crown Open Mare Pace ==
Year	Winner	Age	Driver	Trainer	Owner	Time	Purse	Track
2025	Always B Naughty	5	Austin Hanners	Todd Luther	Greg Luther Racing	1:48 1/5	$400,000	Moh
2024	Twin B Joe Fresh	4	Dexter Dunn	Chris Ryder	Chris Ryder, Dexter Dunn, Peter Trebotica, Barry Spak	1:49 0/0	$400,000	Mxx
2023	Max Contract	4	Andy Miller	Julie Miller	Andy Miller Stable, Jean Goehlen	1:50 2/5	$400,000	HoP
2022	Grace Hill	4	Doug McNair	Virgil Morgan Jr.	Tom Hill	1:48 4/5	$400,000	Moh
2021	Rocknificent	4	Scott Zeron	Linda Toscano	Enviro Stable, South Mountain Stable, Little E LLC	1:49 0/0	$330,000	Mxx
2020	Kissin In The Sand	5	Dexter Dunn	Nancy Takter	Marvin Katz, Hatfield Stables	1:48 4/5	$300,000	HoP
2019	Caviart Ally	5	Andrew McCarthy	Brett Pelling	Caviart Farms	1:49 3/5	$300,000	Moh
2018	Shartin N	5	Tim Tetrick	Jim King Jr.	Richard Poilluci, Joanne Looney-King	1:52 0/0	$320,000	Pcd
2017	Pure Country	4	Mark MacDonald	Jimmy Takter	Diamond Creek Racing	1:51 2/5	$250,000	HoP
2016	Lady Shadow	5	Yannick Gingras	Ron Adams	David Kryway, Carl Atley, Edwin Gold, Bfj Stable	1:49 4/5	$250,000	Mxx
2015	Colors A Virgin	4	David Miller	Brian Brown	Emerald Highlands Farm	1:53 3/5	$250,000	Wdb
2014	Shelliscape	5	John Campbell	Paul J. Fraley	Bamond Racing LLC	1:49 4/5	$281,250	Mxx
2013	Shelliscape	4	David Miller	Paul J. Fraley	Bamond Racing LLC	1:50 0/0	$300,000	Pcd
2012	Androvette	5	Tim Tetrick	Paul J. Fraley	Jeffrey Bamond & Joseph Davino	1:50 1/5	$331,500	Wdb
2011	Androvette	4	Luc Ouelette	Mark Kesmodel	Jeffrey Bamond & Joseph Davino	1:49 2/5	$300,000	Wdb
2010	Dreamfair Eternal	6	Randy Waples	Pat Fletcher	John Lamers	1:50 3/5	$300,000	Pcd
2009	Hana Hanover	5	George Brennan	Mark Steacy	D. Reid, D. MacDonald, S. Klemencic, Dr. Man Son Hing	1:48 4/5	$331,500	Mxx
2008	My Little Dragon	5	Brian Sears	Mike Vanderkemp	Adam Victor & Son Stable	1:50 1/5	$374,000	Moh
2007	Moving Pictures	4	Mark J. MacDonald	Casie Coleman	Steve Calhoun & Mike Lindley	1:51 2/5	$438,000	Moh
2006	Burning Point	6	Ronald Pierce	Steve Elliott	Cuzzins Stable	1:49 2/5	$331,500	Mxx
2005	Loyal Opposition	5	George Brennan	Ervin Miller	Daniel Waxman	1:51 0/0	$331,500	Moh
2004	Always Cam	5	David Miller	Bill Zendt	Cam Land LLC	1:49 2/5	$300,000	Mxx
2003	Eternal Camnation	6	Eric Ledford	Jeffrey Miller	Eternal Camnation Stable	1:51 1/5	$300,000	Wdb
2002	Molly Can Do It	5	Jack Moiseyev	Linda Toscano	Enviro, Langfelder, A & 1, & 3 Brothers Stables	1:49 4/5	$390,000	Mxx
2001	Eternal Camnation	4	Eric Ledford	Jeffrey Miller	Eternal Camnation Stable	1:50 4/5	$332,500	Mxx
2000	Ron's Girl	4	Michel Lachance	Joe Anderson	J. Leahy, G. Pistochini & R. Ranquist	1:50 4/5	$332,500	Mxx
1999	Shore By Five	4	Daniel Dubé	Robert McIntosh	Ferme Carillon	1:50 4/5	$282,500	Mxx
1998	Jay's Table	6	John Campbell	William Robinson	Joseph Leonards	1:49 3/5	$282,500	Mxx
1997	Extreme Velocity	4	John Campbell	Trent Stohler	Stohler Bros. Harness Horses	1:50 3/5	$282,500	Mxx
1996	She's A Great Lady	4	John Campbell	Joe Holloway	L & L DeVissser Partnership	1:50 4/5	$300,000	Mxx
1995	Ellamony	5	Mike Saftic	Stephan Doyle	Charles A. Juravinski	1:54 2/5	$250,000	Nfl
1994	Shady Daisy	6	Michel Lachance	Louis Bauslaugh	Ron Jackson, Louis & Tamela Bauslaugh	1:53 1/5	$250,000	Fhl
1993	Swing Back	4	Kelly Sheppard	Tod Sheppard	Elena Cato	1:52 2/5	$250,000	Moh
1992	Shady Daisy	4	Ronald Pierce	Louis Bauslaugh	Ron Jackson, Louis & Tamela Bauslaugh	1:53 2/5	$250,000	Moh
1991	Delinquent Account	4	Bill O'Donnell	Robert McIntosh	George Segal & Brian Monieson	1:54 2/5	$300,000	Mea
1990	Caesar's Jackpot	4	William Fahy	Michel Bouvrette	Coast To Coast Stable	1:52 3/5	$200,000	Ppk
1989	Armbro Feather	5	John Kopas	Jack Kopas	Armstrong Bros.	1:56 0/0	$287,686	Nfl
1988	Anniecrombie	4	Dave Magee	Bill Darin	John A. Carver	1:52 3/5	$307,256	Mxx
1987	Follow My Star	4	John Campbell	Bruce Nickells	LPG Standardbred Associates	1:53 4/5	$307,662	Lex
1986	Samshu Bluegrass	4	Michel Lachance	Vinnie Aurigemma	Blue Chip Stable, Maniatty & Remmer	1:56 1/5	$264,820	Grd

== See also ==
- List of Breeders Crown Winners
