= Governor's Cup (harness racing) =

- Location: Meadowlands Racetrack East Rutherford, New Jersey
- Inaugurated: 1985
- Race type: Harness race for standardbred pacers
- Website: The Meadowlands

Race information
- Distance: 1 mile (1,609 metres or 8 furlongs)
- Surface: Dirt, 1 mile oval
- Track: Left-handed
- Qualification: 2-year-olds
- Purse: $454,000 (2023)

The Governor's Cup is an American harness racing event run annually for two-year-old Standardbred pacers at a distance of one mile. First run in 1985 as a fixed event at Garden State Park, that track closed on May 3, 2001, and the Governor's Cup would then be run at various race venues in the U.S. Northeast and in Ontario, Canada. In 2013, the race became part of the 'Fall Four' stakes and alternated between Meadowlands Racetrack in East Rutherford, New Jersey and Woodbine Racetrack in Toronto, Ontario. Since 2017, it has been held at Meadowlands Racetrack.

== Historical race events ==
In a 2011 Hambletonian Society article on trainer Ray Schnittker, in referring to the 2009 Governor's Cup winner One More Laugh, author Jay Bergman wrote: "His [One More Laugh] victory in the Governor’s Cup at Harrah's Chester at two may go down as the greatest single effort by a two-year-old in the sports history."

At Woodbine Racetrack, 2010 winner Big Jim, a $35,000 yearling purchase who would go on to career earnings of $1,541,924, set a then world record time of 1:49 1/5 for two-year-old pacers. Through 2015 his time is still the Governor's Cup stakes record.

== Locations ==
- Garden State Park Racetrack (GSP) (1985–2000)
- Meadowlands Racetrack (Mmx) (2001, 2002, 2004, 2006, 2013, 2015, 2017–2023)
- Mohawk Raceway (Moh) (2003)
- Woodbine Racetrack (Wdb) (2005, 2007, 2008, 2010, 2014, 2016)
- Harrah's Chester Racetrack (Chst) (2009, 2011)

== Records ==
Most wins by a driver

- 6 – John Campbell (1989, 1990, 1992, 1993, 2001, 2002)

Most wins by a trainer

- 4 – Robert McIntosh (1995, 1998, 2001, 2008)

Stakes record

- 1:49 1/5 – Big Jim (2010) (Wdb)
- 1:49 2/5 – El Rey (2022) (Mmx)
- 1:52 1/5 – Western Hanover (1991) (GSP)

== Winners of the Governor's Cup Stakes ==
Year	Winner	Driver	Trainer	Owner	Time	Purse	Track
2023	Captain Luke	Todd McCarthy	Tony Alagna	Robert LeBlanc, Pryde Stables Inc., Brad Grant, Steven Head	1:51 0/0	$454,000	Mmx
2022	El Rey	Scott Zeron	Tony Alagna	Brittany Farms LLC, El Rey Racing	1:49 2/5	$430,000	Mmx
2021	Early Action	Brian Sears	Joe Holloway	Val D'Or Farms, Ted Gewertz	1:50 0/0	$386,000	Mmx
2020	Always A Miki	Dexter Dunn	Nancy Takter	Christina Takter, Goran Anderberg, Herb Liverman, Rojan Stables	1:50 2/5	$371,900	Mmx
2019	Papi Rob Hanover	David Miller	Brett Pelling	David McDuffee	1:51 1/5	$401,850	Mmx
2018	Captain Crunch	Scott Zeron	Nancy Johnasson	3 Brothers Stable, Christina Takter, Rojan Stables, Caviart Farms	1:50 3/5	$469,300	Mmx
2017	Lost In Time	Scott Zeron	Jimmy Takter	A Rocknroll Dance Racing, Denny Miller, William Rufenacht, Team S Racing Stable	1:50 1/5	$411,000	Mmx
2016	Downbytheseaside	David Miller	Brian Brown	Country Club Acres Inc., Joe Sbrocco, Richard Lombardo	1:51 1/5	$520,000	Wdb
2015	Boston Red Rocks	Tim Tetrick	Steve Elliot	Peter Blood, Rick Berks	1:50 3/5	$413,000	Mmx
2014	Artspeak	Scott Zeron	Tony Alagna	Brittany Farms, Marvin Katz, Joe Sbrocco, In The Gym Partners	1:50 4/5	$565,000	Wdb
2013	JK Endofanera	Brian Sears	Ron Burke	3 Brothers Stables	1:51 4/5	$534,500	Mmx
2011	A Rocknroll Dance	Yannick Gingras	Jim Mulinix	Jim Mulinix, Denny Miller, Jerry Silva, Theresa Silva	1:51 0/0	$510,000	Chst
2010	Big Jim	Phil Hudon	James Dean	James Carr	1:49 1/5	$709,000	Wdb
2009	One More Laugh	Tim Tetrick	Ray Schnittker	Ray Schnittker, Mathias Meinzinger, Jerry Silva	1:49 2/5	$600,000	Chst
2008	Nebupanezzar	Steve Condren	Robert McIntosh	Peter Pan Stables Inc. (Robert Glazer)	1:51 2/5	$820,000	Wdb
2007	Santanna Blue Chip	Jody Jamieson	Carl R. Jamieson	C. R. Jamieson, 140545 Ontario Ltd., Jeffrey R. Gillis, George Arthur Stable	1:53 1/5	$731,700	Wdb
2006	Sutter Hanover	David Miller	Mark Harder	Deena Frost, Sampson Street Stable, Fox Hollow Farm, TLP Stable	1:52 0/0	$450,000	Mmx
2005	Jereme's Jet	Paul MacDonell	Thomas Harmer	Genesis Racing Stable (Jolene Leahy )	1:53 3/5	$593,032	Wdb
2004	Syncro's Z Tam	Patrick Lachance	Patrick Lachance	MJGB Racing Stable	1:53 1/5	$237,400	Mmx
2003	I Am A Fool	Ronald Pierce	Brett Pelling	Perfect World Enterprises	1:54 1/5	$652,898	Moh
2002	Allamerican Native	John Campbell	Mark Capone	David Scharf, A&G Stables, Jerry Silva	1:53 1/5	$520,000	Mmx
2001	Western Shooter	John Campbell	Robert McIntosh	Robert McIntosh, CSX Stables, Michael Koehler Walnut Hall Ltd'	1:50 0/0	$500,000	Mmx
2000	Bettor's Delight	Eric Ledford	Scott McEneny	John B. Grant	1:52 2/5	$545,300	GSP
1999	Tyberwood	Richard Silverman	Gary Machiz	Leon Machiz	1:51 4/5	$572,400	GSP
1998	Island Fantasy	Michel Lachance	Robert McIntosh	Robert Waxman	1:52 0/0	$600,000	GSP
1997	Sealed N Delivered	Ronald Pierce	Christopher Ryder	Sampson Street Stables	1:52 2/5	$590,600	GSP
1996	The Big Dog	Joe Anderson	Joe Anderson	John J. Leahy & Jayne Cummins	1:51 3/5	$612,600	GSP
1995	Live or Die	Steve Condren	Robert McIntosh		1:54 2/5	$600,000	GSP
1994	CA Connection	Joe Anderson	Kevin Thomas		1:54 1/5	$616,400	GSP
1993	Magical Mike	John Campbell	Tommy Haughton	Shadow Lne Farm	1:54 3/5	$550,000	GSP
1992	Life Sign	John Campbell	Gene Riegle	George Segal	1:53 1/5	$537,800	GSP
1991	Western Hanover	Bill Fahy	Gene Riegle	George Segal	1:52 1/5	$584,300	GSP
1990	Artsplace	John Campbell	Gene Riegle	George Segal, Brian Monieson	1:53 0/0	$655,600	GSP
1989	In The Pocket	John Campbell	Dr. Ken Seeber	LPG Standardbreds Inc.	1:54 2/5	$681,100	GSP
1988	How Bout It	Tommy Haughton	Tommy Haughton		1:54 3/5	$705,100	GSP
1987	No Race	-	No Race	No Race	No Race	0:00 0/0	----
1986	Redskin	Bill O'Donnell	Jerry Smith	Jerry Smith	1:55 0/0	$1,513,500	GSP
1985	Barberry Spur	Bill O'Donnell	Richard Stillings	Roy D. Davis & Barberry Farms	1:54 1/5	$1,257,500	GSP
