= Breeders Crown 3YO Filly Pace =

- Location: North America
- Inaugurated: 1984
- Race type: Harness race for Standardbred pacers
- Website: Hambletonian Society, Inc.

Race information
- Distance: 1 mile (1,609 metres or 8 furlongs)
- Surface: Dirt
- Qualification: 3-year-olds
- Purse: $822,000 (2025)

The Breeders Crown 3YO Filly Pace is a harness racing event for three-year-old Standardbred filly pacers. It is one part of the Breeders Crown annual series of twelve races for both Standardbred trotters and trotters. First run in 1985, it is contested over a distance of one mile. Race organizers have awarded the event to various racetracks across North America.

== Historical race events ==
In 2010, Pocono Downs became the first venue to host all 12 events on a single night. The race ended in a dead heat for the first time in 2025.

== North American locations ==
- Woodbine Racetrack (Wdb) Ontario (9)
- Meadowlands Racetrack (Mxx) New Jersey (7)
- Mohawk Raceway (Moh) Ontario (5)
- Pompano Park (Ppk) Florida (4)
- Harrah's Hoosier Park (HoP) Indiana (3)
- Pocono Downs (Pcd) Pennsylvania (2)
- Garden State Park (Gsp) New Jersey (2)
- Colonial Downs (Cln) Virginia (1)
- Freehold Raceway (Fhl) New Jersey (1)
- Hazel Park (Hpx) Michigan (1)
- Liberty Bell Park (Lib) Pennsylvania (1)
- Northfield Park (Nfl) Ohio (1)
- Northlands Park (NP) Alberta (1)
- Yonkers Raceway (YR) New York (1)

== Records ==
Most wins by a driver

- 4 – John Campbell (1989, 1991, 1992, 1993)

Most wins by a trainer

- 3 – Robert McIntosh (1992, 1993, 2005)

Stakes record

- 1:49 0/0 – Peaky Sneaky (2020)

== Winners of the Breeders Crown 3YO Filly Pace ==
Year	Winner	Driver	Trainer	Owner	Time	Purse	Track
2025	Miki And Minnie	Dexter Dunn	Chris Ryder	Craig Henderson, Robert Mondillo, Lawrence Minowitz	1:49 2/5	$822,000	Moh
2025	The Last Martini	Doug McNair	Jared Bako	Glenview Livestock Ltd.	1:49 2/5	$822,000	Moh
2024	My Girl EJ	Dexter Dunn	Ron Burke	Burke Racing Stable LLC, Weaver Bruscemi LLC, Ron Burke, Elizabeth Novak	1:49 3/5	$600,000	Mxx
2023	Sylvia Hanover	Bob McClure	Mark Steacy	Hudson Standardbred Stable Inc.	1:49 2/5	$600,000	HoP
2022	Treacherous Dragon	Scott Zeron	Nancy Takter	Hot Lead Farm	1:49 1/5	$600,000	Moh
2021	Test Of Faith	David Miller	Brett Pelling	Mel Segal, Kentuckiana Racing Stable, Eddie Gran	1:49 4/5	$600,000	Mxx
2020	Peaky Sneaky	Yannick Gingras	Nancy Takter	Howard Taylor, Judith Taylor, Order By Stable	1:49 0/0	$500,000	HoP
2019	Warrawee Ubeaut	Yannick Gingras	Ron Burke	Burke Racing Stable, J&T Silva-Purnel & Libby, Weaver Bruscemi	1:50 2/5	$550,000	Moh
2018	Percy Bluechip	Matt Kakaley	Ron Burke	Burke Racing Stable, Weaver Bruscemi, Purnel & Libby	1:51 1/5	$500,000	Pcd
2017	Blazin Britches	Trace Tetrick	Brian Brown	Howard Taylor, Judith Taylor, Order By Stable	1:52 1/5	$500,000	HoP
2016	Call Me Queen Be	Scott Zeron	Ross Croghan	Let It Ride Stables, Inc. & Dana Parham	1:49 4/5	$500,000	Mxx
2015	Divine Caroline	David Miller	Joe Holloway	Val Dor Farms, T. Gewertz, Rojan Stables, M. Ouriel	1:51 0/0	$500,000	Wdb
2014	Sayitall Bb	Yannick Gingras	Ron Burke	Burke Racing Stable, Weaver Bruscemi	1:50 3/5	$593,750	Mxx
2013	I Luv The Nitelife	Tim Tetrick	Christopher Ryder	Richard Young & Joanne Young	1:50 0/0	$500,000	Pcd
2012	American Jewel	Tim Tetrick	Jimmy Takter	Brittany Farms	1:52 1/5	$500,000	Wdb
2011	Monkey On My Wheel	Jody Jamieson	Travis Umphrey	Mac Nichol & Travis Umphrey	1:49 3/5	$500,000	Wdb
2010	Put On A Show	Tim Tetrick	Christopher Ryder	Craig Henderson & Richard & Joanne Young	1:52 1/5	$500,000	Pcd
2009	Yellow Diamond	Jim Morrill, Jr.	Tracy Brainard	Bulletproof Enterprises	1:51 2/5	$710,000	Wdb
2008	A and G's Confusion	David Miller	Casie Coleman	A&G Stables	1:51 0/0	$610,000	Mxx
2007	Artcotic	Brian Sears	George Teague, Jr.	Rodney Mitchell & George Teague, Jr.	1:51 2/5	$500,000	Mxx
2006	My Little Dragon	Brian Sears	Noel Daley	Adam Victor & Son Stable	1:52 3/5	$500,000	Wdb
2005	Belovedangel	Ronald Pierce	Robert McIntosh	R. McIntosh Stable, John Fielding, Irving G. Liverman	1:52 1/5	$500,000	Mxx
2004	Rainbow Blue	Ronald Pierce	George Teague, Jr.	K&R Racing, LLC (Kevin & Ron Fry) & Teague, Inc.	1:51 0/0	$610,000	Wdb
2003	Burning Point	Kevin Wallis	Linda Wallis	Cuzzins Stable	1:51 4/5	$720,000	Mxx
2002	Allamerican Nadia	Chris Christoforou, Jr.	John Burns	Burns, Fielding, Berry & Leung	1:53 0/0	$550,000	Wdb
2001	Bunny Lake	John Stark, Jr.	John Stark, Jr.	W Springtime Racing Stable	1:52 4/5	$570,000	Wdb
2000	Popcorn Penny	Ryan Anderson	Joe Anderson	Leahy, Anderson & Cummins	1:52 0/0	$570,000	Moh
1999	Odie's Fame	Dave Wall	Harold Wellwood	Harold Wellwood & Dr. Norman Amos	1:53 0/0	$595,500	Moh
1998	Galleria	George Brennan	Jim Campbell	Jules & Arlene Siegel	1:51 0/0	$480,000	Cln
1997	Stienam's Place	Jack Moiseyev	Bruce Riegle	Goulazian, Guariglia & Greenwald	1:53 0/0	$415,000	Moh
1996	Mystical Maddy	Michel Lachance	Brett Pelling	Peter Pan Stables Inc. (Robert Glazer)	1:55 3/5	$440,000	YR
1995	Headline Hanover	Doug Brown	Stewart Firlotte	Robert H. Grand Holdings	1:55 0/0	$390,000	Wdb
1994	Hardie Hanover	Tim Twaddle	John Burns	Burns, Waples, Ferguson, & Martwest	1:51 4/5	$375,000	Gsp
1993	Immortality	John Campbell	Robert McIntosh	Guida Racing & Winning Verdict Stable	1:55 3/5	$300,000	Fhl
1992	So Fresh	John Campbell	Robert McIntosh	Brittany Farms	1:56 0/0	$350,000	Nfl
1991	Miss Easy	John Campbell	Bruce Nickells	Rose Guida & Royal Palm Stables	1:52 2/5	$300,000	Ppk
1990	Town Pro	Doug Brown	Stew Firlotte	Pro Group Stable	1:54 4/5	$304,933	Ppk
1989	Cheery Hello	John Campbell	Jim Miller	Hugh A. Grant, Jr. & Anthony Pedone	1:55 4/5	$285,701	Ppk
1988	Sweet Reflection	Bill O'Donnell	Steve Elliott	How Sweet It Is Stable	1:55 4/5	$357,506	Hpx
1987	Pacific	Tom Harmer	Tom Harmer	Ciara Stable, Day & Steinbrenner	1:55 0/0	$568,162	Ppk
1986	Glow Softly	Ron Waples	Nelson Guyette	William J. Walsh	1:56 2/5	$549,850	Gsp
1985	Stienam	William "Buddy" Gilmour	Kelly O'Donnell	John Powell, James Leadbetter, Gil Short	1:55 4/5	$412,054	NP
1984	Naughty But Nice	Tommy Haughton	Billy Haughton	William Shehan & Kentuckiana Farms	1:56 4/5	$465,000	Lib

== See also ==
- List of Breeders Crown Winners
