= Donato Hanover =

Standardbred racehorse

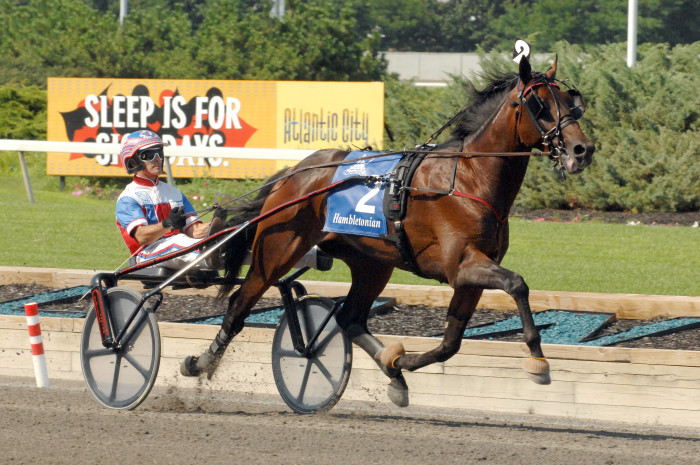
Donato Hanover with their driver, Ron Pierce

Breed = Standartbred , Sire = Andover Hall , Grandsire = Garland Lobell , Sex = Stallion , Foaled = 2004 , Country = United States .

Donato Hanover (foaled 3 April 2004) is a retired Standardbred race horse who was voted the 2007 United States Harness Horse of the Year. He was sired by Andover Hall, out of D Train, a Donerail mare. The colt is currently owned by David B. Scharf, Steven Arnold, and Golden Touch Stable. Donato Hanover earned $2,983,858 during his racing career.

The most notable of Donato Hanover's achievements include wins of the 2007 Hambletonian, the 2007 Kentucky Futurity, the 2007 World Trotting Derby, the 2007 Canadian Trotting Classic, as well as the 2006 Breeders Crown 2YO Colt & Gelding Trot. The colt was the recipient of the 2006 Dan Patch Award for Two-Year-Old Male Trotter.

By winning the Kentucky Futurity, in a world-record 1:50.1, Donato became the first trotter to win more than $2 million in a single season ($2,198,540).

For much of his career, the only loss that he had endured was in his first career start, a non-parimutuel race, considered by some to be a "schooler with a purse". This led to some debate amongst people as to whether or not races such as this should really be considered a loss, and hence that Donato's career should be viewed as perfect. On 17 November 2007, any debate surrounding a so-called perfect career came to an end, when Donato lost, in the stretch, to Arch Madness in the Breeder's Crown eliminations. Despite this loss, during the following week, trainer Steve Elliott, as well as many other notable horsepeople, including superstar driver John Campbell, believed that Donato would rebound with an easy win in the finals, despite the handicap of having drawn post 10. The following Saturday, Donato went off as a 3-5 favorite in the $610,000 final and gunned straight for the lead. The colt was parked until the 3/8 mile mark when he took the lead. He led the race into the stretch, but it was deja vu when Arch Madness took the stretch drive lead and Donato ran out of steam.

The Breeder's Crown marked the end of Donato's career.

The horse began his stud career at Hanover Shoe Farms in 2008.

In 2014 Donato Hanover was inducted into the Harness Racing Museum & Hall of Fame.

== Wins ==
Date	Track	Race	Purse	Finish	Time	Last 1/4	Odds	Driver	Trainer
24 Nov 2007	Meadowlands	Breeder's Crown F	$610 000	3/1Q	1:53.0	28.1	*0.70	Ron Pierce	Steve M. Elliott
17 Nov 2007	Meadowlands	Breeder's Crown E	$25 000	2/2T	1:52.2	27.3	*0.20	Ron Pierce	Steve M. Elliott
06 Oct 2007	Lexington	KyFuturity	$356 160	1/1T	1:50.1	27.3	*0.05	Ron Pierce	Steve M. Elliott
06 Oct 2007	Lexington	KyFuturity	$192 920	1/3H	1:51.1	27.1	*0.20	Ron Pierce	Steve M. Elliott
29 Sep 2007	Lexington	D-Bluegrass	$136 000	1/1T	1:52.0	27.3	*0.05	Ron Pierce	Steve M. Elliott
15 Sep 2007	Mohawk	D-Cdn Trot	$1 000 000	1/3Q	1:54.0	28.3	*0.40	Ron Pierce	Steve M. Elliott
08 Sep 2007	Mohawk	D-Cdn Trot	$40 000	1/2	1:52.3	27.2	*0.20	Ron Pierce	Steve M. Elliott
01 Sep 2007	Duquoin	World Trot Derby	$600 000	1/1Q	1:51.2	27.0	*0.20	Ron Pierce	Steve M. Elliott
23 Aug 2007	Lexington	QUAL	$0	1/50	1:51.3	27.2	NB	Ron Pierce	Steve M. Elliott
04 Aug 2007	Meadowlands	D-Hambo F	$1 500 000	1/1Q	1:53.2	27.2	*1.00	Ron Pierce	Steve M. Elliott
28 Jul 2007	Meadowlands	D-Hambo E	$70 000	1/1	1:53.1	28.3	*0.20	Ron Pierce	Steve M. Elliott
14 Jul 2007	Meadowlands	D-Dancer M	$400 000	1/1	1:54.2	28.2	*0.30	Ron Pierce	Steve M. Elliott
06 Jul 2007	Meadowlands	D-Dancer M	$35 000	1/2Q	1:53.3	27.3	*0.40	Ron Pierce	Steve M. Elliott
29 Jun 2007	Meadowlands	D-Dickerson	$85 000	1/1	1:54.1	28.3	*0.20	Ron Pierce	Steve M. Elliott
14 Jun 2007	Meadowlands	QUAL	$0	1/10T	1:53.3	27.2	NB	Ron Pierce	Steve M. Elliott
31 May 2007	Meadowlands	QUAL	$0	1/T	1:54.1	28.0	NB	Ron Pierce	Steve M. Elliott
24 May 2007	Meadowlands	QUAL	$0	1/2T	1:54.3	28.0	NB	Ron Pierce	Steve M. Elliott
28 Oct 2006	Woodbine	D-Breeder's Crown	$683 100	1/4	1:56.0	30.0	*0.60	Ron Pierce	Steve M. Elliott
20 Oct 2006	Woodbine	D-Breeder's Crown	$28 462	1/T	1:56.2	28.1	*0.20	Ron Pierce	Steve M. Elliott
5 Oct 2006	Lexington	D-Intr Stl	$79 500	1/3	1:57.2	27.2	*0.05	Ron Pierce	Steve M. Elliott
28 Sep 2006	Lexington	D-Bluegrass	$82 800	1/6	1:57.4	28.1	*0.40	Ron Pierce	Steve M. Elliott
15 Sep 2006	Lexington	QUAL	$0	1/15T	1:59.0	29.1	NB	Steve M. Elliott	Steve M. Elliott
3 Aug 2006	Meadowlands	D-Peter Haughton Memorial	$456 000	1/2T	1:55.0	27.1	*0.40	Ron Pierce	Steve M. Elliott
26 Jul 2006	Meadowlands	D-Peter Haughton Memorial	$20 000	1/3Q	1:56.2	29.0	*0.40	Ron Pierce	Steve M. Elliott
19 Jul 2006	Meadowlands	2YR C&G	$5 000	1/H	1:56.4	28.2	NB	Ron Pierce	Steve M. Elliott
29 Jun 2006	Meadowlands	Harriman Cup	$55 675	1/H	1:57.2	28.2	2.50	Ron Pierce	Steve M. Elliott
22 Jun 2006	Meadowlands	2YR C&G	$5 000	3/3Q	1:59.1	28.2	NB	Ron Pierce	Steve M. Elliott
10 Jun 2006	Meadowlands	QUAL	$0	1/1	2:04.1	27.3	NB	Ron Pierce	Steve M. Elliott
3 Jun 2006	Meadowlands	QUAL	$0	4/3T	2:03.0	28.4	NB	Ron Pierce	Steve M. Elliott
