= Breeders Crown 3YO Colt & Gelding Pace =

- Location: North America
- Inaugurated: 1984 (42 years ago)
- Race type: Harness race for Standardbred pacers

Race information
- Distance: 1 mile (1,609 metres or 8 furlongs)
- Surface: Dirt
- Qualification: 3-year-olds
- Purse: $822,000 (2025)

The Breeders Crown 3YO Colt & Gelding Pace is a harness racing event for three-year-old Standardbred male pacers. It is one part of the Breeders Crown annual series of twelve races for both Standardbred pacers and trotters. First run in 1985, it is contested over a distance of one mile. Race organizers have awarded the event to various racetracks across North America.

== North American locations ==
- Woodbine Racetrack (Wdb) Ontario (9)
- Mohawk Raceway (Moh) Ontario (7)
- Meadowlands Racetrack (Mxx) New Jersey (6)
- Pompano Park (Ppk) Florida (4)
- Harrah's Hoosier Park (HoP) Indiana (3)
- Garden State Park (Gsp) New Jersey (3)
- Pocono Downs (Pcd) Pennsylvania (2)
- Colonial Downs (Cln) Virginia (1)
- Yonkers Raceway (YR) New York (1)
- Freehold Raceway (Fhl) New Jersey (1)
- Northfield Park (Nfl) Ohio (1)
- Northlands Park (NP) Alberta (1)

== Records ==
Most wins by a driver

- 4 – Michel Lachance (1989, 1994, 1996, 1998), Tim Tetrick (2009, 2012, 2013, 2023)

Most wins by a trainer

- 5 – Brett Pelling (1996, 1999, 2004, 2005, 2023)

Stakes record

- 1:47 3/5 – Sippinonsearoc (2025)

== Winners of the Breeders Crown 3YO Colt & Gelding Pace ==
Year	Winner	Driver	Trainer	Owner	Time	Purse	Track
2025	Sippinonsearoc	Yannick Gingras	Ron Burke	Burke Racing Stable, Weaver Bruscemi LLC, RAS Racing, Knox Services	1:47 3/5	$822,000	Moh
2024	Mirage Hanover	Dexter Dunn	Jake Leamon	Marvin Rounick	1:48 0/0	$650,000	Mxx
2023	Confederate	Tim Tetrick	Brett Pelling	Diamond Creek Racing	1:48 1/5	$600,000	HoP
2022	Pebble Beach	Todd McCarthy	Noel Daley	Patricia Stable, Joe Sbrocco, Country Club Acres, Laexpressfoderadeovoloente	1:48 1/5	$675,000	Moh
2021	Perfect Sting	David Miller	Joe Holloway	Brittany Farms, Val D'Or Farms	1:49 4/5	$600,000	Mxx
2020	Sandbetweenmytoes	Scott Zeron	Jim Campbell	Fashion Farms	1:48 3/5	$500,000	HoP
2019	Dancin Lou	Andrew McCarthy	Tahnee Camilleri	David Kryway, 1362313 Ontario Ltd.	1:50 2/5	$600,000	Moh
2018	Dorsoduro Hanover	Matt Kakaley	Ron Burke	Burke Racing Stable, J&T Silva-Purnel & Libby, Weaver Bruscemi, Wingfield Five	1:49 4/5	$605,000	Pcd
2017	Beckhams Z Tam	Ricky Macomber Jr.	Jamie Macomber	Z Tam Stables	1:51 1/5	$527,500	HoP
2016	Racing Hill	Brett Miller	Tony Alagna	Tom Hill	1:48 0/0	$500,000	Mxx
2015	Freaky Feet Pete	Trace Tetrick	Larry Rheinheimer	Mary Jo Rheinheimer & Marty R. Rheinheimer	1:50 0/0	$531,250	Wdb
2014	McWicked	Brian Sears	Casie Coleman	S S G Stables	1:49 0/0	$531,250	Mxx
2013	Captaintreacherous	Tim Tetrick	Tony Alagna	Captaintreacherous Racing	1:49 2/5	$500,000	Pcd
2012	Heston Blue Chip	Tim Tetrick	Linda Toscano	Kenneth Jacobs	1:49 2/5	$555,000	Wdb
2011	Betterthancheddar	Mark J. MacDonald	Casie Coleman	Steve Calhoun & West Wins Stable	1:49 2/5	$500,000	Wdb
2010	Rock N Roll Heaven	Daniel Dubé	Bruce Saunders	Frank J. Bellino	1:49 0/0	$500,000	Pcd
2009	If I Can Dream	Tim Tetrick	Tracy Brainard	Bulletproof Enterprises	1:51 1/5	$625,000	Wdb
2008	Somebeachsomewhere	Paul MacDonell	Brent MacGrasth	Schooner Stables	1:48 3/5	$500,000	Mxx
2007	Artist's View	George Brennan	George Sholty	DM Stables & William Rufenacht	1:50 4/5	$555,000	Mxx
2006	Shark Gesture	George Brennan	Erv Miller	Norma & Gerald Smiley & TLP Stable	1:52 1/5	$610,000	Wdb
2005	Rocknroll Hanover	Brian Sears	Brett Pelling	Snyder, Lothlorien Equestrian, Perretti Racing	1:49 4/5	$555,000	Mmx
2004	Western Terror	Brian Sears	Brett Pelling	Perfect World Enterprises	1:50 2/5	$605,000	Wdb
2003	No Pan Intended	David Miller	Ivan Sugg	Peter Pan Stables Inc. (Robert Glazer)	1:50 3/5	$592,000	Mmx
2002	Art Major	John Campbell	William Robinson	Frost, TLP Stable, Silva & Sampson St. Stable	1:51 0/0	$550,000	Wdb
2001	Real Desire	John Campbell	Blair Burgess	Brittany Farms, R. Burgess, K. Olsson Burgess, Perretti Farms	1:50 0/0	$550,000	Wdb
2000	Gallo Blue Chip	Daniel Dubé	Mark Ford	Dan Gernatt Farms	1:51 1/5	450,000	Moh
1999	Grinfromeartoear	Chris Christoforou, Jr.	Brett Pelling	Perfect World Enterprises	1:50 3/5	$450,000	Moh
1998	Artiscape	Michel Lachance	Robert McIntosh	Brittany Farms & Brian Monieson	1:49 3/5	$490,000	Cln
1997	Village Jasper	Paul MacDonell	William Wellwood	Wellwood Stables & AFJ Stable	1:51 4/5	$490,000	Moh
1996	Armbro Operative	Michel Lachance	Brett Pelling	David McDuffee & Tom Walsh	1:54 1/5	$425,000	YR
1995	Jennas Beach Boy	William Fahy	Joe Holloway	L & L DeVisser Partnership	1:52 4/5	$440,000	Wdb
1994	Magical Mike	Michel Lachance	Tommy Haughton	Shadow Lane Farms & David McDuffee	1:51 3/5	$400,000	Gsp
1993	Life Sign	John Campbell	Gene Riegle	Brittany Farms	1:54 2/5	$300,000	Fhl
1992	Kingsbridge	Roger Mayotte	Roger Mayotte	Fern Stable	1:54 4/5	$350,000	Nfl
1991	Three Wizards	William Gale	Dave Elliott	Lanzillotti, Farber, Esse, Gale	1:52 2/5	$357,406	Ppk
1990	Beach Towel	Ray Remmen	Ray Remmen	Uptown Stable	1:51 2/5	$366,933	Ppk
1989	Goalie Jeff	Michel Lachance	Tom Artandi	Centre Ice Stable	1:54 1/5	$377,701	Ppk
1988	Camtastic	Bill O'Donnell	Bob Bencal	Camtastic Stable	1:55 1/5	$501,507	Moh
1987	Call For Rain	Clint Galbraith	Clint Galbraith	Clint & Barbara Galbraith	1:53 0/0	$566,662	Ppk
1986	Masquerade	Richie Silverman	Jerry Silverman	Val d'Or Farms, Ira B. Lampert, Louis P. Guida, Joe J. Grano	1:55 0/0	$543,850	Gsp
1985	Nihilator	Bill O'Donnell	Billy Haughton	Wall Street Stable & Nihilator Stable	1:53 0/0	$565,053	Gsp
1984	Troublemaker	Bill O'Donnell	Gene Riegle	George Segal	1:56 0/0	$507,500	NP
