= Canadian Trotting Classic =

- Class: Grade 1
- Location: Campbellville, Ontario
- Inaugurated: 1976
- Race type: Harness race for Standardbred trotters
- Website: Woodbine Entertainment Group

Race information
- Distance: 1 mile (1,609 metres or 8 furlongs)
- Surface: Dirt, 7/8 mile oval
- Track: Mohawk Raceway
- Qualification: 3-year-olds
- Purse: $615,000 (2025)

The Canadian Trotting Classic is a Grade 1 harness race for three-year-old Standardbred trotters run at a distance of one mile at Mohawk Racetrack in Campbellville, Ontario. The event was first run on October 22, 1976 at the now defunct Greenwood Raceway.

== Locations ==
- Greenwood Raceway : 1978-1993
- Woodbine Racetrack : 1994 - 2001
- Mohawk Racetrack : 2002 to present

== Records ==
Most wins by a driver

- 4 – Tim Tetrick (2012, 2016, 2018, 2019)

Most wins by a trainer

- 5 – Jimmy Takter (1997, 2002, 2014, 2015, 2016) †

Stakes record

- 1:49 4/5 – Emoticon Legacy (2025)

== Winners of the Canadian Trotting Classic ==
Year	Winner	Driver	Trainer	Owner	Time	Purse
2025	Emoticon Legacy	Louis-Philippe Roy	Luc Blais	Determination	1:49 4/5	$615,000
2024	Amazing Catch	Dexter Dunn	Ake Svanstedt	Al Libfeld, Marvin and Lynn Katz, Sam Goldband	1:51 4/5	$713,000
2023	Celebrity Bambino	Yannick Gingras	Ron Burke	Burke Racing Stable LLC, Knox Services Inc., J & T Silva Stables, Phillip Collura	1:51 4/5	$660,000
2022	Slay	Joe Bongiorno	Tony Alagna	Crawford Farms Racing, James Crawford	1:52 1/5	$615,000
2021	Ahundreddollarbill	Andrew McCarthy	Tony Alagna	Crawford Farms Racing, James Crawford	1:52 0/0	$606,500
2020	Chestnut Hill	Andrew McCarthy	Nifty Norman	Melvin Hartman, David McDuffee, Little E LLC	1:53 2/5	$560,000
2019	Green Manalishi S	Tim Tetrick	Marcus Melander	Courant Inc.	1:52 4/5	$605,000
2018	Crystal Fashion	Tim Tetrick	Jim Campbell	Fashion Farms LLC	1:52 1/5	$665,000
2017	What The Hill	David Miller	Ron Burke	Burke Racing Stable, Deo Volente Farms, J & T Silva Stables	1:51 4/5	$684,000
2016	Bar Hopping	Tim Tetrick	Jimmy Takter	Marvin Katz & Alexander J. Libfeld, Christina Takter, Hatfield Stables	1:53 1/5	$687,000
2015	Pinkman	Yannick Gingras	Jimmy Takter	Christina Takter, John & Jim Fielding, Joyce McClelland, Herb Liverman	1:53 3/5	$700,000
2014	Father Patrick	Yannick Gingras	Jimmy Takter	Father Patrick Stable	1:52 4/5	$682,000
2013	Royalty For Life	Brian Sears	George Ducharme	Alfred Ross, Raymond Campbell & Paul Fontaine	1:52 2/5	$686,000
2012	Market Share	Tim Tetrick	Linda Toscano	Richard Gutnick, T L P Stable, William Augustine	1:52 2/5	$1,000,000
2011	Daylon Magician	Jack Moiseyev	David Lemon	David Lemon	1:53 0/0	$1,000,000
2010	Lucky Chucky	John Campbell	Charles Sylvester	SGS Partners, Perretti Racing Stb LLC, Lindy Racing Stable	1:52 2/5	$1,000,000
2009	Muscle Hill	Brian Sears	Gregory B. Peck	Jerry Silva, T L P Stables, Southwind Farm, Muscle Hill Racing LLC	1:53 1/5	$1,000,000
2008	Deweycheatumnhowe	Ray Schnittker	Ray Schnittker	Deweycheatumnhowe Stable	1:53 2/5	$1,000,000
2007	Donato Hanover	Ronald Pierce	Steve M. Elliott	Donato Hanover Syndicate	1:54 0/0	$1,000,000
2006	Majestic Son	Trevor Ritchie	Mark Steacy	Majestic Son Stable	1:52 2/5	$1,000,000
2005	Classic Photo	Ronald Pierce	Ervin M. Miller	H. W. Wright, Classic Photo Stable, Jorgen Jahre, Jr.	1:52 3/5	$1,000,000
2004	Windsongs Legacy	Trond Smedshammer	Trond Smedshammer	Frederik Lindegaard, Theodore Gewertz, Patricia Spinelli	1:53 2/5	$1,155,500
2003	Mr Muscleman	Ronald Pierce	Mike Vanderkemp	Adam Victor & Son Stable	1:54 2/5	$1,314,250
2002	Kadabra	David Miller	Jimmy Takter	Abra Kadabra Stable	1:52 4/5	$1,144,500
2001	SJS Caviar	Robert Blanton, Jr.	Robert Blanton, Jr.	Eli Solomon, Donald Bartling, Kosmos Horse Breeders	1:55 2/5	$1,119,250
2000	Yankee Paco	Trevor Ritchie	Doug McIntosh	Paco Dr. Tom Ivey, Harry Ivey	1:57 3/5	$840,100
1999	Starchip Entrprise	James F. Doherty	James F. Doherty	James F. Doherty, Helen & Frank Rubinetti	1:54 0/0	$420,800
1998	Meadowbranch	Howard Parker	Robert Turner	Mike MB Mike Stable	1:57 1/5	$400,500
1997	Red Xing	Jimmy Takter	Jimmy Takter	Lindy Farms of Connecticut	1:56 4/5	$201,900
1996	Classic Adam	Rick Zeron	Norman C. Jones	Dr. Andrew & Linda Fabian	1:56 0/0	$197,200
1995	Trustworthy	Steve Condren	Robert McIntosh	E. & D. Frost, David McDuffee	1:57 1/5	$211,100
1994	Bye Tsem	Joe Hudon, Jr.	Joe Hudon, Jr.	Marilyn Fromowitz	1:55 0/0	$172,800
1993	Bravely Bold	Jay Picciano	Dennis Ekkert	Rompaway Farms Inc. (Tom Smith)	1:58 2/5	$153,800
1992	Armbro Kissed	Paul MacDonell	Chris Bourassa	Frank Funaro & Antonio Fuoco	1:57 0/0	$142,500
1991	Giant Victory	John F. Patterson, Jr.	John F. Patterson, Jr.	Robins Racing Stable, Theodore & Jacqueline Gewertz	1:58 0/0	$99,600
1990	A Worthy Lad	William "Bud" Fritz	William "Bud" Fritz	Dr. Joe Johnston	1:59 4/5	$207,000
1989	Bon Vivant	Michel Lachance	Neil Shapiro	Bon Vivant Stable	1:57 2/5	$207,000
1988	Armbro Goal	Berndt O. Lindstedt	Jan Johnson	Jim Plate, Paul Ryan, M. Caggiano	1:57 2/5	$311,000
1987	N V Worthy	Robert Walker	Robert Walker	Golden Harvest Stable	1:58 4/5	$270,000
1986	Traveling Salesman	Billy Haughton	Tommy Haughton	Traveling Stable	2:00 3/5	$265,500
1985	Mark Six	Jan Nordin	Jan Nordin	Iain MacKenzie, Carl Vizzi	1:59 2/5	$241,000
1984	Sandy Bowl	Ulf Nordin	Ulf Nordin	KVF Stable Inc.	1:59 2/5	$326,000
1983	Joie De Vie	John Campbell	Howard Beissinger	Siegel, Crown & Lana Lobell Farms	2:00 1/5	$188,400
1982	Incredible Nevele	Glen Garnsey	William Smythe	Nevele Holiday, Stoner Creek & Castleton Farms	2:00 3/5	$75,000
1981	Snack Bar	Hakan Wallner	Jan Johnson	Pieter Ahl	2:01 4/5	$75,000
1980	Devil Hanover	Delvin Miller	Delvin Miller	Florida Stable	2:03 4/5	$75,000
1979	Doublemint	Peter Haughton	Billy Haughton	Em Ar El Stables	1:59 4/5	$75,000
1978	Glencoe Pride	Percy Robillard	Percy Robillard	George Henderson	2:00 4/5	$61,500
1977	Ima Lula	Joe O'Brien	Joe O'Brien	Duncan A. MacDonald	2:01 3/5	$61,500
1976	Keystone Pioneer	Billy Haughton	Billy Haughton	Patricia Bachner, Dorothy Haughton	2:01 1/5	$28,000
