= Art Rooney Pace =

- Location: Yonkers, New York
- Inaugurated: 1989
- Race type: Open harness race for standardbred pacers
- Website: The Hambletonian Society, Inc.

Race information
- Distance: 1 mile (1,609 metres or 8 furlongs)
- Surface: Dirt, 1/2 mile oval
- Track: Yonkers Raceway
- Qualification: 3 year olds
- Purse: $300,000 (2016)

The Art Rooney Pace is an American harness racing event for three-year-old standardbred pacers run each year at Yonkers Raceway with the exception of 2006 when it was hosted by Monticello Raceway. First run in 1989, it is named in honor of Art Rooney (1901–1988), owner of several racetracks, including Yonkers, plus the Pittsburgh Steelers of the National Football League.

== Records ==
Most wins by a driver

- 4 – John Campbell (1990, 1993, 1994, 1999)

Most wins by a trainer

- 4 – William Robinson (1991, 1992, 1994, 1997)

Stakes record

- 1:51 0/0 – Pet Rock (2012)

== Art Rooney Pace winners ==
Year	Winner	Driver	Trainer	Owner	Time	Purse
2019	Bettor's Wish	Dexter Dunn	Chris Ryder			$300,000
2018	Trump Nation	Jason Bartlett				$300,000
2016	Missile J	Brian Sears	Linda Toscano	KJ Stables & Purple Haze Stables	1:53 0/0	$300,000
2015	In The Arsenal	Brian Sears	Kelvin Harrison	White Birch Farm & In The Arsenal Racing	1:51 2/5	$300,000
2014	All Bets Off	Matt Kakaley	Ron Burke	Burke Racing, Weaver Bruscemi, et al.	1:52 2/5	$300,000
2013	Doctor Butch	George Brennan	Linda Toscano	Ken Jacobs	1:51 2/5	$275,000
2012	Pet Rock	Brian Sears	Virgil Morgan Jr.	Frank Bellino	1:51 0/0	$306,204
2011	See You At Peelers	Marcus Johansson	Jimmy Takter	John & Jim Fielding	1:53 1/5	$307,734
2010	One More Laugh	Tim Tetrick	Ray Schnittker	RaySchnittker, Mathias Meinzinger, Jerry Silva	1:53 3/5	$250,000
2009	If I Can Dream	George Brennan	Tracy Brainard	Bulletproof Enterprises	1:52 1/5	$421,850
2008	Badlands Nitro	Brian Sears	George Teague Jr.	George Teague Jr. & John Celii	1:52 4/5	$538,270
2007	Southwind Lynx	Tim Tetrick	George Teague Jr.	K&R Racing & Teague Inc.	1:52 3/5	$1,000,000
2006	Gimmebackmybullets	Stephane Bouchard	Edward Hart	Legacy Racing Stable	1:55 3/5	$490,904
2005	No Race	No Race	No Race	No Race	0:00 0/0	0:00.00
2004	No Race	No Race	No Race	No Race	0:00 0/0	0:00.00
2003	No Pan Intended	David Miller	Ivan Sugg	Peter Pan Stables Inc. (Robert Glazer)	1:54 1/5	$273,983
2002	Ashlee's Big Guy	David Miller	Thomas Artandi	Jim Wheeler, Philip & Dana Steinberg	1:53 4/5	$332,784
2001	Fully Loaded	Luc Ouellette	Arthur McIlmurray	David Scharf & Brian Pinske Stable	1:51 4/5	$305,569
2000	Gallo Blue Chip	Daniel Dubé	Mark Ford	Martin Scharf	1:52 4/5	$319,164
1999	Bolero Master	John Campbell	Jean-Laurier Drolet	Bolero Stable (Paul Deslauriers)	1:53 4/5	$303,995
1998	Shady Character	Jim Morrill Jr.	Brett Pelling	Sanford & Corinne Goldfarb	1:53 3/5	$333,282
1997	Western Dreamer	Michel Lachance	William Robinson	Matthew J., Patrick J. Jr. & Daniel J. Daly	1:53 2/5	$308,083
1996	Firm Belief	Michel Lachance	Gene Riegle	Brittany Farms	1:55 0/0	$304,183
1995	Village Connection	Paul MacDonell	William Wellwood	Wellwood Stables Inc.	1:55 0/0	$276,188
1994	Cam's Card Shark	John Campbell	William Robinson	Jeffrey S. Snyder	1:52 4/5	$377,430
1993	Life Sign	John Campbell	Gene Riegle	Brittany Farms	1:52 1/5	$301,760
1992	Survivor Gold	Jack Moiseyev	William Robinson	Lobro Stables, J. & L. Aarts & Robert H. Grand Holdings	1:53 3/5	$329,950
1991	Precious Bunny	Jack Moiseyev	William Robinson	R. Peter Heffering	1:53 4/5	$383,555
1990	Jake And Elwood	John Campbell	Ken Seeber	Louis P. Guida	1:55 0/0	$304,127
1989	Kick Up A Storm	Ron Waples			1:56 1/5	$300,000
