= Ray Schnittker =

Personal information
- Born: February 11, 1958 (age 68) Buffalo, New York, USA
- Occupations: Harness racing driver, trainer, owner

Horse racing career
- Sport: Horse racing

Major racing wins
- George Morton Levy Free-For-All Pace (1991); Lawrence B. Sheppard Pace (1995, 2016); Canadian Trotting Classic (2008); Governor's Cup Stakes (2009); American National Pace (2010); Art Rooney Pace (2010); Meadowlands Pace (2010) Breeders Crown wins: Breeders Crown 2YO Colt & Gelding Trot (2007); Breeders Crown 2YO Filly Trot (2011); Breeders Crown 2YO Colt & Gelding Pace (2016) U.S. Pacing Triple Crown wins: Cane Pace (2010) U.S. Trotting Triple Crown wins: Kentucky Futurity (1999, 2009); Hambletonian Stakes (2008); Yonkers Trot (2013)

Racing awards
- Dan Patch Trainer of the Year Award (2008)

Significant horses
- Check Me Out, Muscle Hill, Deweycheatumnhowe

Raymond W. "Ray" Schnittker (born February 11, 1958, in Buffalo, New York) is a driver, trainer and owner of Standardbred harness racing horses who is also a Director of the United States Trotting Association His successful horses includes Hambletonian Stakes winner Deweycheatumnhowe.

In 2008, Ray Schnittker was voted the Dan Patch Trainer of the Year Award by the United States Harness Writers Association (USHWA).
