= Breeders Crown Winners =

The following is a complete list of winners of Breeders Crown races, as recorded by the Hambletonian Society.

== 2014 ==
All races held at The Meadowlands

Race	Winner	Driver	Trainer	Time
2YO Colt & Gelding Pace	Traceur Hanover	Andy Miller	Corey Johnson	1:51
2YO Colt & Gelding Trot	Pinkman	Yannick Gingras	Jimmy Takter	1:53.2
2YO Filly Pace	JK She'salady	Tim Tetrick	Nancy Johannson	1:50.2
2YO Filly Trot	Mission Brief	Yannick Gingras	Ron Burke	1:51.4
3YO Colt & Gelding Pace	Mcwicked	Brian Sears	Casie Coleman	1:49
3YO Colt & Gelding Trot	Father Patrick	Yannick Gingras	Jimmy Takter	1:51.4
3YO Filly Pace	Sayitall BB	Yannick Gingras	Ron Burke	1:50.3
3YO Filly Trot	Shake It Cerry	Ronald Pierce	Jimmy Takter	1:52.2
Open Mare Pace	Shelliscape	John Campbell	Paul "P.J." Fraley	1:49.4
Open Mare Trot	Bee A Magician	Brian Sears	R. "Nifty" Norman	1:51.4
Open Pace	Thinking Out Loud	John Campbell	Robert Mcintosh	1:48.3
Open Trot	Commander Crowe	Orjan Kihlstrom	Fabrice Souloy	1:51

== 2013 ==
All races held at Mohegan Sun at Pocono Downs

Race	Winner	Driver	Trainer	Time
2YO Colt & Gelding Pace	Luck Be Withyou	Ronald Pierce	Chris Oakes	1:52
2YO Colt & Gelding Trot	Father Patrick	Yannick Gingras	Jimmy Takter	1:54
2YO Filly Pace	Uffizi Hanover	David Miller	Jimmy Takter	1:52.1
2YO Filly Trot	Shake It Cerry	Ronald Pierce	Jimmy Takter	1:53.4
3YO Colt & Gelding Pace	Captaintreacherous	Tim Tetrick	Tony Alagna	1:49.2
3YO Colt & Gelding Trot	Spider Blue	Ronald Pierce	Charles Sylvester	1:53.3
3YO Filly Pace	I Luv The	Tim Tetrick	Chris Ryder	1:50
3YO Filly Trot	Bee A Magician	Brian Sears	R. "Nifty" Norman	1:52.4
Open Mare Pace	Shelliscape	David Miller	Paul "P.J." Fraley	1:50
Open Mare Trot	Maven	Yannick Gingras	Jonas Czernyson	1:52.3
Open Pace	Foiled Again	Yannick Gingras	Ron Burke	1:49.2
Open Trot	Market Share	Tim Tetrick	Linda Toscano	1:51

== 2012 ==
All races held at Woodbine Racetrack

Race	Winner	Driver	Trainer	Time
2YO Colt & Gelding Pace	Rockin Amadeus	Yannick Gingras	Jimmy Takter	1:51.2
2YO Colt & Gelding Trot	Wheeling N Dealin	Sylvain Filion	R. Dustin Jones	1:56
2YO Filly Pace	Somwherovrarainbow	Andy Miller	George Teague Jr.	1:52.2
2YO Filly Trot	To Dream On	Yannick Gingras	Jimmy Takter	1:54.4
3YO Colt & Gelding Pace	Heston Blue Chip	Tim Tetrick	Linda Toscano	1:49.2
3YO Colt & Gelding Trot	Intimidate	Ronald Pierce	Luc Blais	1:52.4
3YO Filly Pace	American Jewel	Tim Tetrick	Jimmy Takter	1:52.1
3YO Filly Trot	Maven	Yannick Gingras	Jonas Czernyson	1:54
Open Mare Pace	Anndrovette	Tim Tetrick	Paul "P.J." Fraley	1:50.1
Open Mare Trot	Tamla Celeber	Brian Sears	Roger Walmann	1:55.2
Open Pace	Bettor Sweet	Dave Miller	Tom Cancelliere	1:49.1
Open Trot	Chapter Seven	Tim Tetrick	Linda Toscano	1:52.3

== 2011 ==
All races held at Woodbine Racetrack

Race	Winner	Driver	Trainer	Time
2YO Colt & Gelding Pace	Sweet Lou	Dave Palone	Ron Burke	1:49
2YO Colt & Gelding Trot	Uncle Peter	Dave Palone	Jimmy Takter	1:55
2YO Filly Pace	Economy Terror	Brian Sears	Chris Oakes	1:51
2YO Filly Trot	Check Me Out	Ronald Pierce	Ray Schnittker	1:54.4
3YO Colt & Gelding Pace	Betterthancheddar	Mark J. MacDonald	Casie Coleman	1:49.2
3YO Colt & Gelding Trot	Chapter Seven	Jeff Gregory	Linda Toscano	1:53
3YO Filly Pace	Monkey On My Wheel	Jody Jamieson	Travis Umphrey	1:49.3
3YO Filly Trot	Cedar Dove	Ronald Pierce	Noel Daley	1:53.3
Open Mare Pace	Anndrovette	Luc Ouellette	Mark Kesmodel	1:49.2
Open Mare Trot	Frenchfrysnvinegar	Jody Jamieson	Jeffrey Gillis	1:53.3
Open Pace	Bettor Sweet	John Campbell	Tom Cancelliere	1:48.4
Open Trot	San Pail	Randy Waples	Rod Hughes	1:51.4

== 2010 ==
All races held at Mohegan Sun at Pocono Downs

Race	Winner	Driver	Trainer	Time
2YO Colt & Gelding Pace	Big Jim	Phillip Hudon	James Dean	1:50.4
2YO Colt & Gelding Trot	Manofmanymissions	Andy Miller	Erv Miller	1:53.2
2YO Filly Pace	See You At Peelers	Jim Morrill JR.	Jimmy Takter	1:52.1
2YO Filly Trot	Martiniontherocks	Ronald Pierce	R. Dustin Jones	1:57
3YO Colt & Gelding Pace	Rock N Roll Heaven	Daniel Dube	Bruce Saunders	1:49
3YO Colt & Gelding Trot	Break The Bank K	Brian Sears	Trond Smedshammer	1:52.2
3YO Filly Pace	Put On A Show	Tim Tetrick	Chris Ryder	1:52.1
3YO Filly Trot	Impressive Kemp	Ronald Pierce	Noel Daley	1:54.4
Open Mare Pace	Dreamfair Eternal	Randy Waples	Pat Fletcher	1:50.3
Open Mare Trot	Buck I St. Pat	Tim Tetrick	Ron Burke	1:52.3
Open Pace	Won The West	David Miller	Ron Burke	1:49.3
Open Trot	Enough Talk	Ronald Pierce	Peter Kleinhans	1:52

== 2009 ==
Race	Winner	Driver	Trainer	Time	Track
2YO Colt & Gelding Pace	All Speed Hanover	Ronald Pierce	Michael Vanderkemp	1:52	Woodbine Racetrack
2YO Colt & Gelding Trot	Pilgrims Taj	Michel Lachance	Keith Armer	1:57.1	Woodbine Racetrack
2YO Filly Pace	Fancy Filly	Brian Sears	Brenda Teague	1:53.4	Woodbine Racetrack
2YO Filly Trot	Poof She's Gone	David Miller	Richard Norman	1:56.3	Woodbine Racetrack
3YO Colt & Gelding Pace	If I Can Dream	Tim Tetrick	Tracy Brainard	1:51:1	Woodbine Racetrack
3YO Colt & Gelding Trot	Muscle Hill	Brian Sears	Greg Peck	1:54.1	Woodbine Racetrack
3YO Filly Pace	Yellow Diamond	Jim Morrill Jr.	Tracy Brainard	1:51.2	Woodbine Racetrack
3YO Filly Trot	Broadway Schooner	Brian Sears	Jim Campbell	1:56	Woodbine Racetrack
Open Mare Pace	Hana Hanover	George Brennan	Mark Steacy	1:48.4	The Meadowlands
Open Mare Trot	Buck I St. Pat	Tim Tetrick	Ron Burke	1:52	The Meadowlands
Open Pace	Won The West	Jim Morrill Jr.	Ron Burke	1:47	The Meadowlands
Open Trot	Lucky Jim	Andy Miller	Julie Miller	1:52.1	The Meadowlands

== 2008 ==
Race	Winner	Driver	Trainer	Time	Track
2YO Colt & Gelding Pace	Well Said	Ronald Pierce	Steve Elliot	1:51	The Meadowlands
2YO Colt & Gelding Trot	Muscle Hill	Brian Sears	Greg Peck	1:53.3	The Meadowlands
2YO Filly Pace	Fox Valley Topaz	David Miller	Ken Rucker	1:52.4	The Meadowlands
2YO Filly Trot	Honorable Daughter	John Campbell	Larry Remmen	1:55.3	The Meadowlands
3YO Colt & Gelding Pace	Somebeachsomewhere	Paul MacDonell	Brent MacGrath	1:48.3	The Meadowlands
3YO Colt & Gelding Trot	In Focus	Dave Palone	Jimmy Takter	1:53.4	The Meadowlands
3YO Filly Pace	A And G's Confusion	David Miller	Casie Coleman	1:51	The Meadowlands
3YO Filly Trot	Kadealia	Tim Tetrick	George Teague	1:56.1	The Meadowlands
Open Mare Pace	My Little Dragon	Brian Sears	Mike Vanderkemp	1:50.1	Mohawk Racetrack
Open Mare Trot	Brigham Dream	Luc Ouellette	Nicolas Vandenplas	1:53.2	Mohawk Racetrack
Open Pace	Mister Big	Brian Sears	Virgil Morgan Jr.	1:50	Mohawk Racetrack
Open Trot	Corleone Kosmos	John Campbell	Darren McCall	1:51.4	Mohawk Racetrack

== 2007 ==
Race	Winner	Driver	Trainer	Time	Track
2YO Colt & Gelding Pace	Santanna Blue Chip	Jody Jamieson	Carl Jamieson	1:51.3	The Meadowlands
2YO Colt & Gelding Trot	Deweycheatumnhowe	Ray Schnittker	Ray Schnittker	1:57.2	The Meadowlands
2YO Filly Pace	Stylish Artist	George Brennan	Mark Steacy	1:53	The Meadowlands
2YO Filly Trot	Snow White	John Campbell	Kevin Lare	1:55.1	The Meadowlands
3YO Colt & Gelding Pace	Artist's View	George Brennan	George Sholty	1:50.4	The Meadowlands
3YO Colt & Gelding Trot	Arch Madness	Brian Sears	Trond Smedshammer	1:52.4	The Meadowlands
3YO Filly Pace	Artcotic	Brian Sears	George Teague Jr.	1:51.2	The Meadowlands
3YO Filly Trot	Southwind Serena	Yannick Gingras	Per Henriksen	1:55.2	The Meadowlands
Open Mare Pace	Moving Pictures	Mark J. MacDonald	Casie Coleman	1:51.2	Mohawk Racetrack
Open Mare Trot	Mystical Sunshine	Daniel Dube	Chris Ryder	1:54.2	Mohawk Racetrack
Open Pace	Artistic Fella	Tim Tetrick	Steve Elliott	1:49.2	Mohawk Racetrack
Open Trot	Equinox Bi	Trevor Ritchie	Jan Nordin	1:52	Mohawk Racetrack

== 2006 ==
Race	Winner	Driver	Trainer	Time	Track
2YO Colt & Gelding Pace	Charley Barley	Michel Lachance	Kimberlie Miller	1:53.3	Woodbine Racetrack
2YO Colt & Gelding Trot	Donato Hanover	Ronald Pierce	Steve Elliott	1:56s	Woodbine Racetrack
2YO Filly Pace	Calgary Hanover	Michel Lachance	Don Swick	1:53.2	Woodbine Racetrack
2YO Filly Trot	Possess The Magic	Michel Lachance	Ron Gurfein	1:57.2	Woodbine Racetrack
3YO Colt & Gelding Pace	Shark Gesture	George Brennan	Erv Miller	1:52.1	Woodbine Racetrack
3YO Colt & Gelding Trot	Majestic Son	Trevor Ritchie	Mark Steacy	1:54.2	Woodbine Racetrack
3YO Filly Pace	My Little Dragon	Brian Sears	Noel Daley	1:52.3	Woodbine Racetrack
3YO Filly Trot	Susie's Magic	David Miller	Anthony O'Sullivan	1:55.4s	Woodbine Racetrack
Open Mare Pace	Burning Point	Ronald Pierce	Steve Elliot	1:49.2	The Meadowlands
Open Mare Trot	Mystical Sunshine	Ronald Pierce	Chris Ryder	1:53.3	The Meadowlands
Open Pace	Lis Mara	Brian Sears	Ervin Miller	1:47.3	The Meadowlands
Open Trot	Sand Vic	Brian Sears	Trond Smedshammer	1:52.3	The Meadowlands

== 2005 ==
Race	Winner	Driver	Trainer	Time	Track
2YO Colt & Gelding Pace	Jereme's Jet	Paul MacDonell	Tom Harmer	1:52.1	Meadowlands Racetrack
2YO Colt & Gelding Trot	Chocolatier	Doug R. Ackerman	Doug R. Ackerman	1:56.1	Meadowlands Racetrack
2YO Filly Pace	My Little Dragon	Ronald Pierce	Brendan Johnson	1:52.1	Meadowlands Racetrack
2YO Filly Trot	Passionate Glide	Ronald Pierce	Jimmy Takter	1:55.4	Meadowlands Racetrack
3YO Colt & Gelding Pace	Rocknroll Hanover	Brian Sears	Brett Pelling	1:49.4	Meadowlands Racetrack
3YO Colt & Gelding Trot	Strong Yankee	Brian Sears	Trond Smedshammer	1:53.4	Meadowlands Racetrack
3YO Filly Pace	Belovedangel	Ronald Pierce	Robert McIntosh	1:52.1	Meadowlands Racetrack
3YO Filly Trot	Blur	Brian Sears	Trond Smedshammer	1:56.1	Meadowlands Racetrack
Open Mare Pace	Loyal Opposition	George Brennan	Erv Miller	1:51	Mohawk Racetrack
Open Mare Trot	Peaceful Way	Trevor Ritchie	David Tingley	1:53.1	Mohawk Racetrack
Open Pace	Boulder Creek	Brian Sears	Mark Silva	1:49.1	Mohawk Racetrack
Open Trot	Mr. Muscleman	Ronald Pierce	Mike Vanderkemp	1:52	Mohawk Racetrack

== 2004 ==
Race	Winner	Driver	Trainer	Time	Track
2YO Colt & Gelding Pace	Village Jolt	Ronald Pierce	Ed Hart	1:51.1	Woodbine Racetrack
2YO Colt & Gelding Trot	Ken Warkentin	David Miller	Jimmy Takter	1:57.1	Woodbine Racetrack
2YO Filly Pace	Restive Hanover	Andy Miller	Ervin Miller	1:52.4	Woodbine Racetrack
2YO Filly Trot	Flirtin Miss	John Campbell	Jimmy Takter	1:56.1	Woodbine Racetrack
3YO Colt & Gelding Pace	Western Terror	Brian Sears	Brett Pelling	1:50.2	Woodbine Racetrack
3YO Colt & Gelding Trot	Yankee Slide	Brian Sears	Steve Elliott	1:54.4	Woodbine Racetrack
3YO Filly Pace	Rainbow Blue	Ronald Pierce	George Teague	1:51	Woodbine Racetrack
3YO Filly Trot	Housethatruthbuilt	Brian Sears	Trond Smedshammer	1:53.3	Woodbine Racetrack
Open Mare Pace	Always Cam	David Miller	Bill Zendt	1:49.2	The Meadowlands
Open Mare Trot	Armbro Affair	Ronald Pierce	Robert McIntosh	1:54.1	The Meadowlands
Open Pace	Boulder Creek	Ronald Pierce	Mark Silva	1:48.1	The Meadowlands
Open Trot	H P Paque	Brian Sears	Trond Smedshammer	1:52.2	The Meadowlands

== 2003 ==
Race	Winner	Driver	Trainer	Time	Track
2YO Colt & Gelding Pace	I Am A Fool	Ronald Pierce	Brett Pelling	1:52.2	Meadowlands Racetrack
2YO Colt & Gelding Trot	Cantab Hall	Michel Lachance	Ron Gurfein	1:56.4	Meadowlands Racetrack
2YO Filly Pace	Pans Culottes	Dan Dube	Ben Wallace	1:54.3	Meadowlands Racetrack
2YO Filly Trot	Forever Scarlet	David Miller	Brett Pelling	1:57.4	Meadowlands Racetrack
3YO Colt & Gelding Pace	No Pan Intended	David Miller	Ivan Sugg	1:50.3	Meadowlands Racetrack
3YO Colt & Gelding Trot	Mr Muscleman	Ronald Pierce	Noel Daley	1:54.2	Meadowlands Racetrack
3YO Filly Pace	Burning Point	Kevin Wallis	Linda Wallis	1:51.4	Meadowlands Racetrack
3YO Filly Trot	Stroke Play	Brian Sears	Trond Smedshammer	1:55.2	Meadowlands Racetrack
Open Mare Pace	Eternal Camnation	Eric Ledford	Jeff Miller	1:51.1	Woodbine Racetrack
Open Pace	Art Major	John Campbell	Bill Robinson	1:49.4s	Woodbine Racetrack
Open Trot	Fool's Goal	Jack Moiseyev	Jim Doherty	1:52.4s	Woodbine Racetrack

== 2002 ==
Race	Winner	Driver	Trainer	Time	Track
2YO Colt & Gelding Pace	Totally Western	Mario Baillargeon	Ben Wallace	1:53.2	Woodbine Racetrack
2YO Colt & Gelding Trot	Broadway Hall	John Campbell	Jim Campbell	1:57.2	Woodbine Racetrack
2YO Filly Pace	Armbro Amoretto	Luc Ouellette	David Smith	1:53s	Woodbine Racetrack
2YO Filly Trot	Pick Me Up	Luc Ouellette	D. McCall	1:57.3	Woodbine Racetrack
3YO Colt & Gelding Pace	Art Major	John Campbell	Bill Robinson	1:51s	Woodbine Racetrack
3YO Colt & Gelding Trot	Kadabra	Dave Miller	Jim Takter	1:54.1	Woodbine Racetrack
3YO Filly Pace	Allamerican Nadia	Chris Christoforou Jr.	John Burns	1:53s	Woodbine Racetrack
3YO Filly Trot	Cameron Hall	Trevor Ritchie	Bob Stewart	1:55.4s	Woodbine Racetrack
Open Mare Pace	Molly Can Do It	Jack Moiseyev	Linda Toscano	1:49.4	The Meadowlands
Open Pace	Real Desire	John Campbell	Blair Burgess	1:48.3	The Meadowlands
Open Trot	Fool's Goal	Jack Moiseyev	Jim Doherty	1:51.3	The Meadowlands

== 2001 ==
Race	Winner	Driver	Trainer	Time	Track
2YO Colt & Gelding Pace	Western Shooter	John Campbell	Robert McIntosh	1:51	Woodbine Racetrack
2YO Colt & Gelding Trot	Duke Of York	Paul MacDonell	John Bax	1:57.3	Woodbine Racetrack
2YO Filly Pace	Cam Swifty	Jim Meittinis	Don Swick	1:52.4	Woodbine Racetrack
2YO Filly Trot	Cameron Hall	Michel Lachance	Bob Stewart	1:57.3	Woodbine Racetrack
3YO Colt & Gelding Pace	Real Desire	John Campbell	Blair Burgess	1:50	Woodbine Racetrack
3YO Colt & Gelding Trot	Liberty Balance	Randy Waples	Pat Hunt	1:55	Woodbine Racetrack
3YO Filly Pace	Bunny Lake	John Stark Jr.	John Stark Jr.	1:52.4	Woodbine Racetrack
3YO Filly Trot	Syrinx Hanover	John Campbell	Chris Marino	1:55.1	Woodbine Racetrack
Open Mare Pace	Eternal Camnation	Eric Ledford	Jeff Miller	1:50.4	The Meadowlands
Open Pace	Goliath Bayama	Sylvain Filion	Yves Filion	1:48.4	The Meadowlands
Open Trot	Varenne	Giampaolo Minnucci	Jori Turja	1:51.1	The Meadowlands

== 2000 ==
Race	Winner	Driver	Trainer	Time	Track
2YO Colt & Gelding Pace	Bettor's Delight	Michel Lachance	Scott McEneny	1:52.4	Mohawk Racetrack
2YO Colt & Gelding Trot	Banker Hall	Trevor Ritchie	Harald Lunde	1:56.1	Mohawk Racetrack
2YO Filly Pace	Lady MacBeach	Luc Ouellette	Joe Holloway	1:55.3	Mohawk Racetrack
2YO Filly Trot	Syrinx Hanover	Trevor Ritchie	Chris Marino	1:55.3	Mohawk Racetrack
3YO Colt & Gelding Pace	Gallo Blue Chip	Daniel Dube	Mark Ford	1:51.1	Mohawk Racetrack
3YO Colt & Gelding Trot	Fast Photo	Michel Lachance	Don Swick	1:55.4	Mohawk Racetrack
3YO Filly Pace	Popcorn Penny	Ryan Anderson	Joe Anderson	1:52	Mohawk Racetrack
3YO Filly Trot	Aviano	Trevor Ritchie	Bill Wellwood	1:56	Mohawk Racetrack
Open Mare Pace	Ron's Girl	Michel Lachance	Joe Anderson	1:50.4	The Meadowlands
Open Pace	Western Ideal	Michel Lachance	Brett Pelling	1:48	The Meadowlands
Open Trot	Magician	Dave Miller	Earl Cruise	1:53.1	The Meadowlands

== 1999 ==
Race	Winner	Driver	Trainer	Time	Track
2YO Colt & Gelding Pace	Tyberwood	Richie Silverman	Gary Machiz	1:52.4	Mohawk Raceway
2YO Colt & Gelding Trot	Master Lavec	Dan Daley	Dan Daley	1:56.4	Mohawk Raceway
2YO Filly Pace	Eternal Camnation	Eric Ledford	Jeff Miller	1:52.3	Mohawk Raceway
2YO Filly Trot	Dream Of Joy	Jim Meittinis	Per Eriksson	1:57.2	Mohawk Raceway
3YO Colt & Gelding Pace	Grinfromeartoear	Chris Christoforou Jr.	Brett Pelling	1:50.3	Mohawk Raceway
3YO Colt & Gelding Trot	CR Renegade	Rod Allen	Carl Allen	1:54.2	Mohawk Raceway
3YO Filly Pace	Odie's Fame	Dave Wall	Harold Wellwood	1:53	Mohawk Raceway
3YO Filly Trot	Oolong	Ronald Pierce	Per Henriksen	1:56	Mohawk Raceway
Open Mare Pace	Shore By Five	Daniel Dube	Robert McIntosh	1:50.4	The Meadowlands
Open Pace	Red Bow Tie	Luc Ouellette	Monte Gelrod	1:50	The Meadowlands
Open Trot	Supergrit	Ronald Pierce	Carl Conte Jr.	1:53.1	The Meadowlands

== 1998 ==
Race	Winner	Driver	Trainer	Time	Track
2YO Colt & Gelding Pace	Badlands Hanover	Ronald Pierce	Joe Holloway	1:50	Colonial Downs
2YO Colt & Gelding Trot	CR Commando	Carl Allen	Carl Allen	1:53.2	Colonial Downs
2YO Filly Pace	Juliet's Fate	George Brennan	Brett Pelling	1:52	Colonial Downs
2YO Filly Trot	Musical Victory	Luc Ouellette	Per Eriksson	1:55.3	Colonial Downs
3YO Colt & Gelding Pace	Artiscape	Michel Lachance	Robert McIntosh	1:49.3	Colonial Downs
3YO Colt & Gelding Trot	Muscles Yankee	John Campbell	Charles Sylvester	1:53	Colonial Downs
3YO Filly Pace	Galleria	George Brennan	Jim Campbell	1:51	Colonial Downs
3YO Filly Trot	Lassie's Goal	Mark O'Mara	Mark O'Mara	1:54.3	Colonial Downs
Open Mare Pace	Jay's Table	John Campbell	Bill Robinson	1:49.3	The Meadowlands
Open Pace	Red Bow Tie	Luc Ouellette	Monte Gelrod	1:50.1	The Meadowlands
Open Trot	Moni Maker	Wally Hennessey	Jimmy Takter	1:52.3	The Meadowlands

== 1997 ==
Race	Winner	Driver	Trainer	Time	Track
2YO Colt & Gelding Pace	Artiscape	Michel Lachance	Robert McIntosh	1:53.2	Mohawk Raceway
2YO Colt & Gelding Trot	Catch As Catch Can	Wally Hennessey	Ron Gurfein	2:01.1	Mohawk Raceway
2YO Filly Pace	Take Flight	Luc Ouellette	Alan Riegle	1:54.1	Mohawk Raceway
2YO Filly Trot	My Dolly	Wally Hennessey	Osvaldo Formia	1:59.1	Mohawk Raceway
3YO Colt & Gelding Pace	Village Jasper	Paul MacDonell	Bill Wellwood	1:51.4	Mohawk Raceway
3YO Colt & Gelding Trot	Malabar Man	Mal Burroughs	Jim Takter	1:55.2	Mohawk Raceway
3YO Filly Pace	Stienam's Place	Jack Moiseyev	Bruce Riegle	1:53	Mohawk Raceway
3YO Filly Trot	No Nonsense Woman	Jim Doherty	Jim Doherty	1:56.2	Mohawk Raceway
Open Mare Pace	Extreme Velocity	John Campbell	Trent Stohler	1:50.3	The Meadowlands
Open Pace	Armbro Operative	Michel Lachance	Brett Pelling	1:50.3	The Meadowlands
Open Trot	Wesgate Crown	John Campbell	"Raz" MacKenzie	1:52.4	The Meadowlands

== 1996 ==
Race	Winner	Driver	Trainer	Time	Track
2YO Colt & Gelding Pace	His Mattjesty	Doug Brown	Stew Firlotte	1:54.4	Mohawk Raceway
2YO Colt & Gelding Trot	Malabar Man	Mal Burroughs	Jimmy Takter	1:59.1	Mohawk Raceway
2YO Filly Pace	Before Sunrise	Steve Condren	Gene Riegle	1:55.3	Mohawk Raceway
2YO Filly Trot	Armbro Prowess	Jimmy Takter	Jimmy Takter	1:59.2	Mohawk Raceway
3YO Colt & Gelding Pace	Armbro Operative	Michel Lachance	Brett Pelling	1:54.1	Yonkers Raceway
3YO Colt & Gelding Trot	Running Sea	Wally Hennessey	Charles Sylvester	1:55	Vernon Downs
3YO Filly Pace	Mystical Maddy	Michel Lachance	Brett Pelling	1:55.3	Yonkers Raceway
3YO Filly Trot	Personal Banner	Peter Wrenn	Bill Gallagher	1:54.1	Vernon Downs
Open Mare Pace	She's A Great Lady	John Campbell	Joe Holloway	1:50.4	The Meadowlands
Open Pace	Jenna's Beach Boy	Bill Fahy	Joe Holloway	1:48.4	The Meadowlands
Open Trot	CR Kay Suzie	Rod Allen	Carl Allen	1:52.3	The Meadowlands

== 1995 ==
Race	Winner	Driver	Trainer	Time	Track
2YO Colt & Gelding Pace	John Street North	Jack Moiseyev	Bill Robinson	1:53.3	Garden State Park
2YO Colt & Gelding Trot	Armbro Officer	Lee Asher	Robert McIntosh	1:58.3	Garden State Park
2YO Filly Pace	Paige Nicole Q	John Campbell	Charles Sylvester	1:53.4	Garden State Park
2YO Filly Trot	Continentalvictory	Michel Lachance	Ron Gurfein	1:55.3	Garden State Park
3YO Colt & Gelding Pace	Jenna's Beach Boy	Bill Fahy	Joe Holloway	1:52.4	Woodbine Racetrack
3YO Colt & Gelding Trot	Abundance	William O'Donnell	John Ducharme	1:58	Woodbine Racetrack
3YO Filly Pace	Headline Hanover	Doug Brown	Stew Firlotte	1:55	Woodbine Racetrack
3YO Filly Trot	Lookout Victory	John Patterson Jr.	Per Eriksson	1:57.3	Woodbine Racetrack
Open Mare Pace	Ellamony	Mike Saftic	Stephan Doyle	1:54.2	Northfield Park
Open Mare Trot	CR Kay Suzie	Rod Allen	Carl Allen	1:58.1	Delaware County Fairgrounds
Open Pace	That'll Be Me	Roger Mayotte	Robert Young	1:52.4	Northfield Park
Open Trot	Panifesto	Luc Ouellette	Bill Robinson	1:56.1	Delaware County Fairgrounds

== 1994 ==
Race	Winner	Driver	Trainer	Time	Track
2YO Colt & Gelding Pace	Jenna's Beach Boy	Bill Fahy	Joe Holloway	1:51.4	Woodbine Racetrack
2YO Colt & Gelding Trot	Eager Seelster	Ted Jacobs	Ted Jacobs	1:58.3	Woodbine Racetrack
2YO Filly Pace	Yankee Cashmere	Peter Wrenn	Brett Bittle	1:56	Woodbine Racetrack
2YO Filly Trot	Lookout Victory	John Patterson Jr.	Per Eriksson	1:57.2	Woodbine Racetrack
3YO Colt & Gelding Pace	Magical Mike	Michel Lachance	Tom Haughton	1:51.3	Garden State Park
3YO Colt & Gelding Trot	Incredible Abe	Italo Tamborrino	Charles Sylvester	1:54.1	Garden State Park
3YO Filly Pace	Hardie Hanover	Tim Twaddle	John Burns	1:51.4	Garden State Park
3YO Filly Trot	Imageofa Clear Day	William O'Donnell	Doug McIntosh	1:55.2	Garden State Park
Open Mare Pace	Shady Daisy	Michel Lachance	Louis Bauslaugh	1:53.1	Freehold Raceway
Open Mare Trot	Armbro Keepsake	Stig Johansson	Stig Johansson	1:57.4	Freehold Raceway
Open Pace	Village Jiffy	Paul MacDonell	Bill Wellwood	1:52.2	Freehold Raceway
Open Trot	Pine Chip	John Campbell	Charles Sylvester	1:55.2	Freehold Raceway

== 1993 ==
Race	Winner	Driver	Trainer	Time	Track
2YO Colt & Gelding Pace	Expensive Scooter	Jack Moiseyev	Bill Robinson	1:54.2	Freehold Raceway
2YO Colt & Gelding Trot	Wesgate Crown	John Campbell	G. R. "Raz" MacKenzie	1:57.1	Pompano Harness
2YO Filly Pace	Electric Slide	Michel Lachance	Robert McIntosh	1:55.3	Freehold Raceway
2YO Filly Trot	Gleam	Jimmy Takter	Jimmy Takter	1:58.4	Pompano Harness
3YO Colt & Gelding Pace	Life Sign	John Campbell	Gene Riegle	1:54.2	Freehold Raceway
3YO Colt & Gelding Trot	Pine Chip	John Campbell	Charles Sylvester	1:54.2	Pompano Harness
3YO Filly Pace	Immortality	John Campbell	Robert McIntosh	1:55.3	Freehold Raceway
3YO Filly Trot	Expressway Hanover	Per Henriksen	Per Henriksen	1:55.4	Pompano Harness
Open Mare Pace	Swing Back	Kelly Sheppard	Tod Sheppard	1:52.2	Mohawk Raceway
Open Mare Trot	Lifetime Dream	Paul MacDonell	George "Butch" Elliott	1:55.4	Mohawk Raceway
Open Pace	Staying Together	William O'Donnell	Robert McIntosh	1:51.1	Mohawk Raceway
Open Trot	Earl	Chris Christoforou Jr.	Chris Christoforou Sr.	1:56	Mohawk Raceway

== 1992 ==
Race	Winner	Driver	Trainer	Time	Track
2YO Colt & Gelding Pace	Village Jiffy	Ron Waples	Bill Wellwood	1:53.2	Pompano Harness
2YO Colt & Gelding Trot	Giant Chill	John Patterson Jr.	Per Eriksson	1:58.2	Pompano Harness
2YO Filly Pace	Immortality	John Campbell	Bruce Nickells	1:54.4	Pompano Harness
2YO Filly Trot	Winky's Goal	Catello Manzi	Charles Sylvester	1:59.2	Pompano Harness
3YO Colt & Gelding Pace	Kingsbridge	Roger Mayotte	Roger Mayotte	1:54.4	Northfield Park
3YO Colt & Gelding Trot	Baltic Striker	Michel Lachance	Ron Gurfein	1:55.4	Pompano Harness
3YO Filly Pace	So Fresh	John Campbell	Robert McIntosh	1:56	Northfield Park
3YO Filly Trot	Imperfection	Michel Lachance	Ron Gurfein	1:57	Pompano Harness
Open Mare Pace	Shady Daisy	Ronald Pierce	Louis Bauslaugh	1:53.2	Mohawk Raceway
Open Mare Trot	Peace Corps	Torbjorn Jansson	Torbjorn Jansson	1:58	Mohawk Raceway
Open Pace	Artsplace	John Campbell	Robert McIntosh	1:52	Mohawk Raceway
Open Trot	No Sex Please	Ron Waples	Ron Waples Jr.	1:56.4	Mohawk Raceway

== 1991 ==
Race	Winner	Driver	Trainer	Time	Track
2YO Colt & Gelding Pace	Digger Almahurst	Doug Brown	Stew Firlotte	1:52.1	Pompano Harness
2YO Colt & Gelding Trot	King Conch	Bill Gale	Per Eriksson	1:56.2	Pompano Harness
2YO Filly Pace	Hazleton Kay	John Campbell	Bruce Nickells	1:53.4	Pompano Harness
2YO Filly Trot	Armbro Keepsake	John Campbell	Charles Sylvester	1:58.1	Pompano Harness
3YO Colt & Gelding Pace	Three Wizzards	Bill Gale	Dave Elliott	1:52.2	Pompano Harness
3YO Colt & Gelding Trot	Giant Victory	Ronald Pierce	Per Eriksson	1:56	Pompano Harness
3YO Filly Pace	Miss Easy	John Campbell	Bruce Nickells	1:52.2	Pompano Harness
3YO Filly Trot	Twelve Speed	Ron Waples	Mark Loewe	1:57	Pompano Harness
Open Mare Pace	Delinquent Account	William O'Donnell	Robert McIntosh	1:54.2	The Meadows
Open Mare Trot	Me Maggie	Berndt Lindstedt	Jan Johnson	1:58.2	The Meadows
Open Pace	Camluck	Michel Lachance	Robert McIntosh	1:52.1	The Meadows
Open Trot	Billyjojimbob	Paul MacDonell	Mike Wade	1:57.4	The Meadows

== 1990 ==
All races held at Pompano Harness

Race	Winner	Driver	Trainer	Time
2YO Colt & Gelding Pace	Artsplace	John Campbell	Gene Riegle	1:51.1
2YO Colt & Gelding Trot	Crysta's Best	Dick Richardson Jr.	Dick Richardson Jr.	2:01
2YO Filly Pace	Miss Easy	John Campbell	Bruce Nickells	1:54
2YO Filly Trot	Jean Bi	Jan Nordin	Soren Nordin	2:00.3
3YO Colt & Gelding Pace	Beach Towel	Ray Remmen	Ray Remmen	1:51.2
3YO Colt & Gelding Trot	Embassy Lobell	Michel Lachance	Jerry Riordan	1:56.4
3YO Filly Pace	Town Pro	Doug Brown	Stew Firlotte	1:54.4
3YO Filly Trot	Me Maggie	Berndt Lindstedt	Jan Johnson	1:57.1
Open Mare Pace	Caesar's Jackpot	Bill Fahy	Michel Bouvrette	1:52.3
Open Mare Trot	Peace Corps	Stig Johansson	Stig Johansson	1:54.2
Open Pace	Bay's Fella	Paul MacDonell	Mike DeMenno	1:52.1
Open Trot	No Sex Please	Ron Waples	Ron Waples Jr.	1:55

== 1989 ==
Race	Winner	Driver	Trainer	Time	Track
2YO Colt & Gelding Pace	Till We Meet Again	Mickey McNichol	Abe Stotzfus	1:56.2	Pompano Harness
2YO Colt & Gelding Trot	Royal Troubador	Carl Allen	Carl Allen	1:59.2	Pompano Harness
2YO Filly Pace	Town Pro	Doug Brown	Stew Firlotte	1:55	Pompano Harness
2YO Filly Trot	Delphi's Lobell	Ron Waples	Per Eriksson	1:59.3	Pompano Harness
3YO Colt & Gelding Pace	Goalie Jeff	Michel Lachance	Tom Artandi	1:54.1	Pompano Harness
3YO Colt & Gelding Trot	Esquire Spur	Dick Stillings	Dick Stillings	1:56.1	Pompano Harness
3YO Filly Pace	Cheery Hello	John Campbell	Jim Miller	1:55.4	Pompano Harness
3YO Filly Trot	Peace Corps	John Campbell	Tom Haughton	1:57	Pompano Harness
Open Mare Pace	Armbro Feather	John Kopas	Jack Kopas	1:56	Northfield Park
Open Mare Trot	Grades Singing	Olle Goop	Olle Goop	1:57.3	Blue Bonnets
Open Pace	Matt's Scooter	Michel Lachance	Harry Poulton	1:53.2	Freehold Raceway
Open Trot	Delray Lobell	John Campbell	Art Wirsching	1:57.2	Freestate Raceway

== 1988 ==
Race	Winner	Driver	Trainer	Time	Track
2YO Colt & Gelding Pace	Kentucky Spur	Dick Stillings	Dick Stillings	1:53.2	Pompano Harness
2YO Colt & Gelding Trot	Valley Victory	William O'Donnell	Steve Elliott	1:58.1	Pompano Harness
2YO Filly Pace	Central Park West	John Campbell	Bruce Nickells	1:53.3	Pompano Harness
2YO Filly Trot	Peace Corps	John Campbell	Tom Haughton	1:57.1	Pompano Harness
3YO Colt & Gelding Pace	Camtastic	William O'Donnell	Bob Bencal	1:55.1	Mohawk Raceway
3YO Colt & Gelding Trot	Firm Tribute	Mark O'Mara	Mark O'Mara	1:55.3	The Meadows
3YO Filly Pace	Sweet Reflection	William O'Donnell	Steve Elliott	1:55.4	Hazel Park Harness
3YO Filly Trot	Nalda Hanover	Mickey McNichol	Soren Nordin	2:02	Rosecroft Raceway
Open Mare Pace	Anniecrombie	Dave Magee	Bill Darin	1:52.3	The Meadowlands
Open Mare Trot	Armbro Flori	Larry Walker	George Sholty	1:59.3	Batavia Downs
Open Pace	Call For Rain	Clint Galbraith	Clint Galbraith	1:53.2	Scioto Downs
Open Trot	Mack Lobell	John Campbell	Charles Sylvester	1:56	Saratoga Harness

== 1987 ==
Race	Winner	Driver	Trainer	Time	Track
2YO Colt & Gelding Pace	Camtastic	William O'Donnell	Bob Bencal	1:56.2	Rosecroft Raceway
2YO Colt & Gelding Trot	Defiant One	Howard Beissinger	Howard Beissinger	2:01.4	Mohawk Raceway
2YO Filly Pace	Leah Almahurst	Bill Fahy	Gene Riegle	2:00.1	Freestate Raceway
2YO Filly Trot	Nan's Catch	Berndt Lindstedt	Jan Johnson	2:00.2	Hazel Park Harness
3YO Colt & Gelding Pace	Call For Rain	Clint Galbraith	Clint Galbraith	1:53	Pompano Harness
3YO Colt & Gelding Trot	Mack Lobell	John Campbell	Charles Sylvester	1:54.1	Pompano Harness
3YO Filly Pace	Pacific	Tom Harmer	Tom Harmer	1:55	Pompano Harness
3YO Filly Trot	Armbro Fling	George Sholty	George Sholty	1:57.3	Pompano Harness
Open Mare Pace	Follow My Star	John Campbell	Bruce Nickells	1:53.4	The Red Mile
Open Mare Trot	Grades Singing	Olle Goop	Olle Goop	1:58.3	Northfield Park
Open Pace	Armbro Emerson	Walter Whelan	Brian Burton	1:54.1	Roosevelt Raceway
Open Trot	Sugarcane Hanover	Ron Waples	Jim Simpson	1:54.3	The Meadowlands

== 1986 ==
Race	Winner	Driver	Trainer	Time	Track
2YO Colt & Gelding Pace	Sunset Warrior	Bill Gale	Robert McIntosh	1:55.3	Garden State Park
2YO Colt & Gelding Trot	Mack Lobell	John Campbell	Charles Sylvester	1:59.1	Pompano Harness
2YO Filly Pace	Halcyon	Ray Remmen	Ray Remmen	1:58	Rosecroft Raceway
2YO Filly Trot	Super Flora	Ron Waples	Jim Miller	1:59.2	Canterbury Downs
3YO Colt & Gelding Pace	Masquerade	Richie Silverman	Jerry Silverman	1:55	Garden State Park
3YO Colt & Gelding Trot	Sugarcane Hanover	Ron Waples	Jim Simpson	1:57.1	Garden State Park
3YO Filly Pace	Glow Softly	Ron Waples	Nelson Guyette	1:56.2	Garden State Park
3YO Filly Trot	JEF's Spice	William O'Donnell	Jim Gluhm	1:59	Freehold Raceway
Open Mare Pace	Samshu Bluegrass	Michel Lachance	Vinnie Aurigemma	1:56.1	Greenwood Raceway
Open Mare Trot	Grades Singing	Herve Filion	Herve Filion	1:57.4	Scioto Downs
Open Pace	Forrest Skipper	Lucien Fontaine	Lucien Fontaine	1:53.4	Los Alamitos
Open Trot	Nearly Perfect	Mickey McNichol	Joe Caraluzzi	1:57.2	Louisville Downs

== 1985 ==
Race	Winner	Driver	Trainer	Time	Track
2YO Colt & Gelding Pace	Robust Hanover	John Campbell	Wallace Bruce	1:56.4	Rosecroft Raceway
2YO Colt & Gelding Trot	Express Ride	John Campbell	George Sholty	2:01.3	The Meadows
2YO Filly Pace	Caressable	Herve Filion	Bill Haughton	2:00	Yonkers Raceway
2YO Filly Trot	JEF's Spice	Mickey McNichol	Jim Gluhm	1:58.4	Garden State Park
3YO Colt & Gelding Pace	Nihilator	William O'Donnell	Billy Haughton	1:53	Garden State Park
3YO Colt & Gelding Trot	Prakas	John Campbell	Per Eriksson	1:57.1	Mohawk Raceway
3YO Filly Pace	Stienam	Wm. "Buddy" Gilmour	Kelly O'Donnell	1:55.4	Northlands Park
3YO Filly Trot	Armbro Devona	William O'Donnell	Charles Sylvester	1:57.3	Pompano Harness
Open Pace	Division Street	Michel Lachance	Vinnie Aurigemma	1:52.3	Freestate Raceway
Open Trot	Sandy Bowl	John Campbell	Soren Nordin	1:56.3	Sportsman's Park

== 1984 ==
Race	Winner	Driver	Trainer	Time	Track
2YO Colt & Gelding Pace	Dragon's Lair	Jeff Mallet	Jeff Mallet	1:54.1	The Meadows
2YO Colt & Gelding Trot	Workaholic	Berndt Lindstedt	Jan Johnson	1:57.1	The Red Mile
2YO Filly Pace	Amneris	John Campbell	Soren Nordin	1:57.1	Maywood Park
2YO Filly Trot	Conifer	George Sholty	George Sholty	2:01.2	Mohawk Raceway
3YO Colt & Gelding Pace	Troublemaker	William O'Donnell	Gene Riegle	1:56f	Northlands Park
3YO Colt & Gelding Trot	Baltic Speed	Jan Nordin	Soren Nordin	1:57.2	Pompano Harness
3YO Filly Pace	Naughty But Nice	Tommy Haughton	Bill Haughton	1:56.4	Liberty Bell Park
3YO Filly Trot	Fancy Crown	William O'Donnell	Ted Andrews	1:59.2	Rosecroft Raceway
