= Gene Riegle =

Personal information
- Born: June 3, 1928 Greenville, Ohio
- Died: October 17, 2011 (aged 83) Greenville, Ohio
- Occupation: Harness racing horse trainer

Horse racing career
- Sport: Horse racing

Major racing wins
- Adios Pace (1972); Little Brown Jugette (1982, 1988); Governor's Cup Stakes (1990, 1991, 1992); Metro Pace (1990); New Jersey Classic Pace (1992); Hambletonian Oaks (1992); Art Rooney Pace (1993, 1996) Breeders Crown wins: Breeders Crown 2YO Filly Pace (1987, 1996); Breeders Crown 2YO Colt & Gelding Pace (1990); Breeders Crown 3YO Colt & Gelding Pace (1993, 1984) U.S. Pacing Triple Crown wins: Messenger Stakes (1984, 1992); Cane Pace (1992); Little Brown Jug (1993)

Racing awards
- Dan Patch Trainer of the Year Award (1990)

Honours
- Little Brown Jug Wall of Fame (1992); United States Harness Racing Hall of Fame (1992)

Significant horses
- Artsplace, Jay Time, Life Sign, Troublemaker

Grant E. "Gene" Riegle (June 3, 1928 – October 17, 2011) was an American harness racing driver and trainer. He was inducted into the Harness Racing Hall of Fame in 1992.

Riegle started his harness racing career in 1950. His father, Roy Riegle, was also a driver and trainer. Roy Riegle and his wife were killed in a 1957 auto accident.

At the 1972 Little Brown Jug, Riegle drove Jay Time who was the odds on favorite before the race. Jay Time, who finished in a dead heat with Strike Out one month earlier in the Adios Pace, was scratched after the first heat due to a high temperature.

During the 1981 Woodrow Wilson Pace held at Meadowlands Raceway, Riegle was thrown from his sulky while driving Andre Hanover in the process of trying to avoid a fallen horse. He suffered minor abrasions. 1992 Harness racing horse of the year, Artsplace, was trained by Riegle.

In 1990, Riegle along with Bruce Nickells, were awarded the Glen Garnsey Trophy as United States Trainer of the Year.

Riegle trained 1993 Little Brown Jug winner, Life Sign.

Riegle died at his Greenville, Ohio home on October 17, 2011.
