= Little Brown Jugette =

- Location: Delaware, Ohio
- Inaugurated: 1971 (55 years ago)
- Race type: Harness race for standardbred pacers

Race information
- Distance: 1 mile (1,609 metres or 8 furlongs)
- Surface: Dirt, 1/2 mile oval
- Track: Delaware County Fairgrounds racetrack
- Qualification: Three-year-old fillies
- Purse: $305,000 (2023)

The Little Brown Jugette is an American harness racing event for three-year-old fillies run annually since 1971 at the Delaware County Fairgrounds racetrack in Delaware, Ohio. It is the counterpart to the Little Brown Jug for colts.

== History ==
In the 2003 race, Numeric Hanover won as a result of the disqualification for interference of Odds On Charmaine, who had finished first but set back to fifth.

Call Me Queen Be won the first heat of the 2016 Jugette in a world record time for three-year-old pacing fillies. Hall of Fame driver John Campbell guided L A Delight to a win in the second heat to earn the overall Jugette title and in so doing broke his own record for most wins with his fifth Jugette. Similarly, Hall of Fame trainer Robert McIntosh earned his third win, tying him with Billy Haughton for most Jugette victories.

Party Girl Hill broke the world record again in 2020 in the first heat with a time of 1:49 3/5. She then went on to win the final.

== Records ==
Most wins by a driver

- 5 – John Campbell (1985, 1989, 1992,1998, 2016)

Most wins by a trainer

- 4 – Ron Burke (2012, 2015, 2019, 2022)

Stakes record

- 1:49 3/5 – Party Girl Hill (2020 - 1st heat)

== Little Brown Jugette winners ==
Year	Winner	Driver	Trainer	Owner	Time	Purse
2023	Ucandoit Blue Chip	Scott Zeron	Linda Toscano	Bill Elliott	1:50 2/5	$305,000
2022	Treacherous Dragon	Dexter Dunn	Nancy Takter	Hot Lead Farm	1:51 0/0	$255,100
2021	Scarlett Hanover	Tim Tetrick	Ron Burke	Burke Racing Stable, Frank Baldachino, J&T Silva Purnel & Libb, Weaver Bruscemi	1:56 0/0	$253,800
2020	Party Girl Hill	Dexter Dunn	Chris Ryder	Tom Hill	1:50 3/5	$237,725
2019	Warrawee Ubeaut	Yannick Gingras	Ron Burke	Burke Racing Stable LLC, Phillip Collura, J&T Silva Purnel & Libb, Weaver Bruscemi LLC	1:50 1/5	$259,600
2018	Alexa's Power	Tim Tetrick	Jim Campbell	Jeffery Snyder, Michael Snyder	1:51 2/5	$230,700
2017	Caviart Ally	Andrew McCarthy	Noel Daley	Caviart Farms	1:51 3/5	$273,250
2016	L A Delight	John Campbell	Robert McIntosh	Robert McIntosh Stables Inc., CSX Stables, Al McIntosh Holdings Inc	1:51 3/5	$239,400
2015	Sassa Hanover	Matt Kakaley	Ron Burke	Buke, Panhellenic, Weaver, Bruscemi, Ktarr	1:51 1/5	$252,250
2014	Color's A Virgin	Trace Tetrick	Brian Brown	Emerald Highlands Farm	1:52 4/5	$298,100
2013	I Luv The Nitelife	Tim Tetrick	Christopher J. Ryder	Richard & Joanne Young	1:51 2/5	$257,750
2012	Darena Hanover	Yannick Gingras	Ron Burke	Burke Racing Stable	1:51 0/0	$296,050
2011	Idyllic	David Miller	Casie Coleman	West Winds Stable, LaCova, Lacova, Campagnuolo	1:54 0/0	$292,350
2010	Western Silk	Mark J. MacDonald	Casie Coleman	Casie Coleman Stable & Thomas Hill	1:53 1/5	$353,400
2009	Showherthemoney	Jim Morrill, Jr.	Tracy Brainard	Bulletproof Enterprises	1:53 0/0	$350,000
2008	Good News Lady	Greg Grismore	Jimmy Takter	Brittany Farms, Val D'Or Farms, C. Takter	2:05 1/5	$300,475
2007	Western Graduate	Yannick Gingras	Mickey Burke	Burke, Cherichello, Leon, Karr	1:51 3/5	$300,000
2006	Eternity's Delight	David Miller	Travis Alexander	Arlene L. & Jules J. Siegel	1:53 2/5	$252,000
2005	Just Wait Kate	Eric Ledford	Travis Alexander	Arlene L. & Jules J. Siegel	1:52 0/0	$332,650
2004	Glowing Report	George Brennan	Jerry Silverman	Marvin J. Rounick	1:53 0/0	$294,650
2003	Numeric Hanover	Dave Palone	William Robinson	2 Titans Racing Stable	1:53 4/5	$313,150
2002	Always Cam	Eric Ledford	William Zendt	Cam Land LLC	1:53 3/5	$293,328
2001	Pleasure Chest	Mike Saftic	Mark Harder	Brian Nixon & Aubrfey Friedman	1:54 4/5	$358,175
2000	Eternal Camnation	Eric Ledford	Jeffrey Miller	Eternal Camnation Stable (Doc & Dorothy Miller)	1:54 4/5	$300,671
1999	Maudlin Hanover	Dave Palone	Mike Palone	George Leon, FLG Partnership, Mike Palone	1:53 0/0	$303,500
1998	Armbro Romance	John Campbell	Brett Pelling	Armstrong Bros.	1:53 1/5	$319,637
1997	Stienam's Place	Jack Moiseyev	Bruce Riegle	P. Goulazian, J. Greenwald, B. Guariglia	1:56 2/5	$295,420
1996	Paige Nicole Q	Peter Wrenn	Charles Sylvester	Alan H. Quinn	1:53 1/5	$304,800
1995	Magic Shopper	Tony Morgan	Bret Schultz	Charles & Julie R. Nash	1:54 4/5	$279,300
1994	Electric Slide	Luc Ouellette	Robert McIntosh	Guida Racing Stable	1:53 2/5	$240,120
1993	Towner's Image	Tim Twaddle	John Burns	J. Burns, Martwest Racing Stable, K. Waples	1:52 3/5	$225,590
1992	So Fresh	John Campbell	Robert McIntosh	Brittany Farms	1:55 1/5	$262,350
1991	Sarah Loren Rd.	Ron Waples	Eddie Burns	Waples Stables & Van Stables	2:00 1/5	$253,870
1990	Lady Genius	Michel Lachance	Tom Artandi	R. Bencal, D. Cass, J. Gural, D. Stolz	1:55 3/5	$200,000
1989	Cheery Hello	John Campbell	Jim Miller	Hugh A. Grant, Jr. & Anthony P. Pedone	1:55 2/5	$200,790
1988	Leah Almahurst	Bill Fahy	Gene Riegle	Brittany Farms	1:56 2/5	$221,460
1987	Armbro Feather	Jack Kopas	Jack Kopas	Armstrong Bros.	1:57 4/5	$200,000
1986	Anniecrombie	George Sholty	George Sholty	Rodney B. Hatfield	1:56 3/5	$208,300
1985	Amneris	John Campbell	Billy Haughton	Cedar Farm & Robert J. Key	1:55 1/5	$157,710
1984	Naughty But Nice	Tom Haughton	Billy Haughton	M. Crouch, Kentuckiana Farm & W. Shehan	1:55 3/5	$158,353
1983	Turn The Tide	Bill O'Donnell	Louis Meittinis	Woodlands Farms, Katz, Alderman & Alderman	1:57 1/5	$119,886
1982	Three Diamonds	Bruce Riegle	Gene Riegle	George Segal	1:57 3/5	$140,115
1981	Watering Can	Stanley Dancer	John Haffard	Stoner Creek Stud	1:58 1/5	$86,398
1980	Toy Poddle	William Herman	Dick Wenzel	James S. Michael	1:58 4/5	$90,877
1979	Roses Are Red	Jack Kopas	Jack Kopas	Alan Leavitt, Jack Rosenfeld & Sirocco Stable	1:56 3/5	$75,257
1978	Passing Glance	George Sholty	George Sholty	Judith & Alvan Field	1:56 4/5	$78,663
1977	Mistletoe Shalee	Stanley Dancer	Stanley Dancer	Rachel L. Dancer	1:58 3/5	$59,542
1976	Misty Raquel	Jerry Graham	Jerry Graham	Misty Farm & Rac Ed Nav Stable	1:58 2/5	$60,060
1975	Silk Stockings	Preston Burris, Jr.	Preston Burris, Sr.	Au Clair Syndicate	1:57 2/5	$40,884
1974	Handle With Care	Billy Haughton	Billy Haughton	Irving G. Liverman	1:57 4/5	$45,558
1973	All Alert	Glen Garnsey	Glen Garnsey	Castleton Farm Stable	2:01 1/5	$36,684
1972	Romalie Hanover	Roland Beaulieu	Roland Beaulieu	Mitzie Stable	1:58 1/5	$35,460
1971	Jefferson Time	Ben Webster	Ben Webster	Abraham Schiltz	2:00 1/5	$30,414
