= Betsy Ross Mares Invitational Pace =

- Location: Chester, Pennsylvania, United States
- Race type: Harness race for Standardbred pacers
- Website: Harrah's Philadelphia Racetrack

Race information
- Distance: 1 mile (1,609 metres or 8 furlongs)
- Surface: Dirt, 5/8 mile oval
- Track: Harrah's Philadelphia
- Qualification: 4-year-olds and up
- Purse: $100,000 (2024)

The Betsy Ross Mares Invitational Pace is a harness race for Standardbred mare pacers run annually since 2008 at Harrah's Philadelphia Racetrack. It is a part of the annual "Super Sunday" card held on the last Sunday in May.

== Historical race events ==
In 2009, Southwind Tempo won her second straight Betsy Ross Pace. Her time of 1:48 3/5 set a World Record for female pacers over a 5/8 mile track. That record stood until Twin B Joe Fresh won the race in 1:48 2/5 in 2024.

There was no race in 2020 due to the COVID-19 pandemic.

== Records ==
Most wins by a horse

- 2 – Southwind Tempo (2008, 2009), Anndrovette (2011, 2014), Shartin N (2018, 2019)

Most wins by a driver

- 6 – Tim Tetrick (2009, 2011, 2014, 2016, 2018, 2019)

Most wins by a trainer

- 2 – Ross Croghan (2008, 2009), Jim King, Jr. (2018, 2019)

Most wins by an Owner

- 3 – Bamond Racing LLC (211, 2014, 2016)

Stakes record

- 1:48 2/5 – Twin B Joe Fresh (2024)

== Winners of the Betsy Ross Mares Invitational Pace ==
Year	Winner	Age	Driver	Trainer	Owner	Time	Purse
2024	Twin B Joe Fresh	4	Dexter Dunn	Chris Ryder	Chris Ryder, Dexter Dunn, Peter Trebotica, Barry Spak	1:48 2/5	$100,000
2023	Max Contract	4	Andy Miller	Julie Miller	Andy Miller Stable Inc., Jean Goehlen	1:49 0/0	$100,000
2022	Majorca N	7	Corey Callahan	Dylan Davis	Michael Casalino, Jr., Dylan Davis	1:49 3/5	$100,000
2021	Keep Rockin A	5	Brian Sears	Richard "Nifty" Norman	Richard Poillucci	1:50 1/5	$100,000
2020	No Race	-	No Race	No Race	No Race	0:00 0/0	$000,000
2019	Shartin N	6	Tim Tetrick	Jim King, Jr.	Richard Poillucci, Joann Looney-King, Tim Tetrick LLC	1:49 2/5	$100,000
2018	Shartin N	5	Tim Tetrick	Jim King, Jr.	Richard Poillucci, Joann Looney-King	1:49 3/5	$150,000
2017	Lady Shadow	6	Yannick Gingras	Ron Adams	David Kryway, Carl Atley, Edwin Gold, BFJ Stable	1:49 0/0	$150,000
2016	Venus Delight	6	Tim Tetrick	Jeffrey Bamond, Jr.	Bamond Racing LLC	1:50 4/5	$200,000
2015	Radar Contact	7	John Campbell	Noel Daley	Charles Stillings & Dean Ehrgott	1:51 1/5	$150,000
2014	Anndrovette	7	Tim Tetrick	Paul J. Fraley	Bamond Racing LLC & Joseph Davino	1:50 2/5	$250,000
2013	Economy Terror	4	Matt Kakaley	Christopher Oakes	Chuck Pompey, Howard Taylor, Edwin Gold	1:51 1/5	$250,000
2012	Royal Cee Cee N	6	Ronald Pierce	Mark Harder	Mark Harder	1:49 3/5	$100,000
2011	Anndrovette	4	Tim Tetrick	Mark Kesmodel	Bamond Racing LLC & Joseph Davino	1:49 4/5	$150,000
2010	Cuz She Can	5	Ronald Pierce	Ron Burke	Bulletproof Enterprises	1:49 4/5	$100,000
2009	Southwind Tempo	5	Tim Tetrick	Ross Croghan	Jerry Silva & Let It Ride Stable, Inc.	1:48 3/5	$250,000
2008	Southwind Tempo	4	John Campbell	Ross Croghan	Jerry Silva & Let It Ride Stable, Inc.	1:50 2/5	$250,000
