= Muscle Hill =

American Standardbred racehorse

- Breed: Standardbred
- Sire: Muscles Yankee
- Grandsire: Valley Victory
- Dam: Yankee Blondie
- Damsire: American Winner
- Sex: Stallion
- Foaled: 2006
- Country: United States
- Colour: Bay
- Breeder: Winbak Farm
- Owner: Muscle Hill Racing LLC
- Trainer: Gregory B. Peck
- Record: 21:20-1-0
- Earnings: $3,273,342

Major wins
- Peter Haughton Memorial (2008); Stanley Dancer Memorial (2009); Canadian Trotting Classic (2009); World Trotting Derby (2009) Breeders Crown wins: Breeders Crown 2YO Colt & Gelding Trot (2008); Breeders Crown 3YO Colt & Gelding Trot (2009) U.S. Trotting Triple Crown wins: Hambletonian Stakes (2009); Kentucky Futurity (2009)

Awards
- 2-Year Old Trotter of the Year (2008); 3-Year Old Trotter of the Year (2009); United States Trotter of the Year (2009); United States Harness Horse of the Year (2009); Canadian Trotter of the Year (2009); Canadian Harness Horse of the Year (2009)

Honours
- U.S. Harness Racing Hall of Fame (2016)
- Last updated on November 22, 2016

Muscle Hill is a trotting stallion, by super sire Muscles Yankee, who won a Breeders Crown race in 2008 and 2009. He is driven by Brian Sears and trained by Greg Peck.

Muscle Hill was purchased by Tom Pontone for $55,000 at the Harrisburg Yearling Sales in 2007. He showed great promise as a two-year-old winning the Peter Haughton Memorial and 2008 Breeders Crown Two Year Old Colt Trot. He went on to win $817,301 and eight of nine races and was named the United States 2-Year Old Colt Trotter of the Year.

In 2009 he went on to win all of his races as a three-year-old, including the Hambletonian, the Canadian Trotting Classic, the American-National, the World Trotting Derby, the Kentucky Futurity and the Breeders Crown. In The Hambletonian he won in 1:50.1 which was a stakes record and tied the fastest time for a trotter of any age at The Meadowlands. He won by six lengths, the largest winning margin in The Hambletonian since Mack Lobell in 1987. At the end of 2009 he retired to stud with career prize money of $3,273,342, and having won the last 20 of the 21 races in which he competed. The $2,456,041 that he won in 2009 was a record for a single season for either a trotter or a pacer. He was voted United States Harness Horse of the Year for 2009, the first time a trotter had won the award for an undefeated season. He never came close to defeat in his twenty wins which were all by a margin of at least one length.

At stud his early foals have included Hambletonian winner Trixton and top filly Mission Brief, Marion Marauder - 1 50,2 - 2013 g.- winner Hambletonian, Bar Horring - 1.51,4 - 2013 g., Manchego - 1.49,0 - 2015 g.

In January 2016 it was announced that Muscle Hill would be inducted into the Living Horse Hall of Fame.
