= Tim Tetrick =

American harness racing driver

Personal information
- Born: November 22, 1981 Flora, Illinois, United States
- Occupation: Harness racing driver

Horse racing career
- Sport: Horse racing
- Career wins: 12,000+

Major racing wins
- Meadowlands Pace (2007, 2010, 2013, 2014, 2017); Art Rooney Pace (2007, 2010); Ben Franklin Free-For-All Pace (2007, 2008, 2010); Betsy Ross Mares Invitational Pace (2009, 2011, 2014, 2016, 2018); Canadian Trotting Classic (2009, 2012, 2016); Lady Liberty Pace (2009, 2015, 2018, 2019); Tattersalls Pace (2009, 2013); William R. Haughton Memorial Pace (2009, 2015); Canadian Trotting Classic (2012, 2016); Metro Pace (2012); Woodrow Wilson Pace (2012); North America Cup (2013, 2015); Little Brown Jugette (2013); Canadian Pacing Derby (2013); Maple Leaf Trot (2013); Governor's Cup Stakes (2015) Breeders Crown wins: Breeders Crown Open Pace (2007); Breeders Crown 3YO Filly Trot (2008) (2018); Breeders Crown Open Mare Trot (2009, 2010); Breeders Crown 3YO Colt & Gelding Pace (2009, 2012, 2013, 2016); Breeders Crown 3YO Filly Pace (2010, 2012, 2013); Breeders Crown Open Trot (2012, 2013); Breeders Crown Open Mare Pace (2012) (2018); Breeders Crown 2YO Filly Pace (2014); Breeders Crown 2YO Colt & Gelding Pace (2015, 2016); Breeders Crown 2YO Colt & Gelding Trot (2016) U.S. Pacing Triple Crown wins: Messenger Stakes (2009); Cane Pace (2010, 2013) U.S. Trotting Triple Crown wins: Hambletonian Stakes (2012)

Racing awards
- Dan Patch Rising Star Award (2007); Harness Tracks of America Driver of the Year (2007, 2008, 2012, 2013) USHWA Hall of Fame 2020

Significant horses
- Anndrovette, Captaintreacherous; Chapter Seven, He's Watching, JK Shesalady, Fireside Chat, Huntsville, Walner, Crystal Fashion, Alexa's Power, Shartin N
- Updated on November 12, 2016

Timothy A. Tetrick (born November 22, 1981) is an American Harness Racing driver. Tim started driving Standardbreds at a very young age and on November 27, 2007, broke the record of number of wins (1,077) in a single year. Tim drove his 1,078th winner at Dover Downs in Delaware on the way to recording 1,189 wins that year.

Tetrick won the 2012 Hambletonian Stakes with his horse Market Share. He won his 8,000th career race in March 2014. He was voted Harness Tracks of America Driver of the Year for 2007, 2008, 2012, and 2013 by the United States Harness Writers Association.

He underwent hip replacement surgery in early December, 2008 for a congenital hip problem, but was back competing by late January 2009.

Tetrick's colors are green and gold. He is also recognizable on the track by the bright yellow wheels on the sulky he drives. He has been a resident of Runnemede, New Jersey.
