= Deweycheatumnhowe =

Standardbred racehorse

Deweycheatumnhowe (foaled 12 April 2005) is an American Standardbred racehorse. He was a champion trotting colt and was named for the fictional law firm Dewey, Cheatem & Howe. He was sired by Muscles Yankee and was out of Trolley Square, a daughter of Speedy Somolli. He was bred by Steve Jones of Cameo Hills Farm and was trained and driven by Ray Schnittker.

Deweycheatumnhowe raced in 2007 and 2008. He was undefeated in all ten of his starts as a two-year-old, earning $936,191. His major victories that year included the Valley Victory Trot, the Breeders Crown for two-year-old male trotters, the New Jersey Sire Stakes Final, the Bluegrass Stakes, the International Stallion Stakes and the Harriman Cup.

At three, Deweycheatumnhowe won 12 of 15 starts and earned $2,218,987. His victories included the Hambletonian Stakes, the Canadian Trotting Classic, the World Trotting Derby, the Stanley Dancer Memorial, the Kentucky Futurity, the Bluegrass Stakes and the Dickerson Cup. He finished third in the 2008 Breeders Crown for three-year-old male trotters, behind winner In Focus and second-place finisher Holiday Credit.

Deweycheatumnhowe finished his racing career with 22 wins, one second-place finish and two third-place finishes from 25 starts. He earned $3,155,178 and recorded a best time of 1:50.4, set in the 2008 World Trotting Derby. He was voted Dan Patch and Nova Two-Year-Old Trotting Colt of the Year in 2007 and Dan Patch Trotter of the Year and Dan Patch and Nova Three-Year-Old Trotting Colt of the Year in 2008.

In October 2008, it was announced that Deweycheatumnhowe would stand at Walnut Hall Ltd. for the 2009 breeding season. His stud fee was set at $25,000 and his book was limited to 140 mares.

== Race history ==
Date	Track	Race	Purse	Finish	Time	Last 1/4	Odds	Driver	Trainer
29 November 2008	Meadowlands	Breeders Crown Final	$500,000	3/5 3/4	1:55.0	29.1	*0.80	Ray Schnittker	Ray Schnittker
31 October 2008	Vernon Downs	3-5 YO Open	$20,000	1/6 1/4	1:55.2	28.2	.00	Ray Schnittker	Ray Schnittker
4 October 2008	Red Mile	Kentucky Futurity	$136,800	1/HD	1:59.3	26.1	1.00	Ray Schnittker	Ray Schnittker
4 October 2008	Red Mile	Kentucky Futurity	$273,600	3/2	1:53.0	28.1	*0.30	Ray Schnittker	Ray Schnittker
4 October 2008	Red Mile	Kentucky Futurity	$273,600	1/HD	1:52.3	27.2	*0.70	Ray Schnittker	Ray Schnittker
27 September 2008	Red Mile	Bluegrass Stakes	$107,200	1/6	1:52.2	28.0	*0.05	Ray Schnittker	Ray Schnittker
13 September 2008	Mohawk	Canadian Trotting Classic Final	$1,000,000	1/2	1:53.2	27.4	*1.30	Ray Schnittker	Ray Schnittker
6 September 2008	Mohawk	Canadian Trotting Classic Elimination	$40,000	2/T	1:54.3	27.4	*0.15	Ray Schnittker	Ray Schnittker
30 August 2008	Du Quoin	World Trotting Derby	$565,000	1/T	1:50.4	27.1	*0.20	Ray Schnittker	Ray Schnittker
15 August 2008	Vernon Downs	3&4 Yr Open	$30,000	1/8	1:54.0	28.2	NB	Ray Schnittker	Ray Schnittker
2 August 2008	Meadowlands	Hambletonian Final	$1,500,000	1/H	1:52.0	28.3	*0.40	Ray Schnittker	Ray Schnittker
26 July 2008	Meadowlands	Hambletonian Elimination	$70,000	1/6Q	1:52.3	29.0	*0.20	Ray Schnittker	Ray Schnittker
11 July 2008	Meadowlands	Stanley Dancer Memorial Final	$175,000	1/3	1:53.2	27.4	*0.20	Ray Schnittker	Ray Schnittker
4 July 2008	Meadowlands	Stanley Dancer Memorial Elimination	$35,000	1/4H	1:52.2	27.2	*E0.50	Ray Schnittker	Ray Schnittker
27 June 2008	Meadowlands	Dickerson Cup	$79,110	1/H	1:53.3	28.4	*E0.05	Ray Schnittker	Ray Schnittker
19 June 2008	Meadowlands	Qualifier	$0	1/3Q	1:53.1	27.1	NB	Ray Schnittker	Ray Schnittker
5 June 2008	Meadowlands	Qualifier	$0	1/10	1:54.0	28.2	NB	Ray Schnittker	Ray Schnittker
24 November 2007	Meadowlands	Breeders Crown Final	$650,000	1/1	1:57.2	29.1	*0.60	Ray Schnittker	Ray Schnittker
16 November 2007	Meadowlands	Breeders Crown Elimination	$25,000	1/3	1:59.0	27.1	*0.20	Ray Schnittker	Ray Schnittker
27 October 2007	Woodbine	Valley Victory Final	$666,050	1/2H	1:58.0	29.4	*0.25	Ray Schnittker	Ray Schnittker
20 October 2007	Woodbine	Valley Victory Elimination	$23,000	1/1Q	1:56.4	28.3	*0.15	Ray Schnittker	Ray Schnittker
4 October 2007	Lexington	2YoC-Stk	$90,500	1/3H	1:54.2	28.2	*0.10	Ray Schnittker	Ray Schnittker
27 September 2007	Lexington	2YoC-Stk	$92,000	1/2H	1:55.3	29.3	*0.30	Ray Schnittker	Ray Schnittker
13 September 2007	Vernon Downs	Qualifier	$0	1/8Q	1:57.2	29.0	NB	Ray Schnittker	Ray Schnittker
18 July 2007	Meadowlands	New Jersey Sire Stakes Final	$175,000	1/NK	1:57.0	27.4	*0.80	Ray Schnittker	Ray Schnittker
11 July 2007	Meadowlands	2YrC NJSS	$34,750	1/1H	1:57.4	29.0	*0.90	Ray Schnittker	Ray Schnittker
4 July 2007	Meadowlands	2YrC NJSS	$35,250	1/4T	1:58.0	30.2	*0.70	Ray Schnittker	Ray Schnittker
28 June 2007	Meadowlands	Harriman Cup	$53,500	1/5	1:59.0	29.0	E3.40	Ray Schnittker	Ray Schnittker
20 June 2007	Meadowlands	Qualifier	$0	1/T	2:03.3	28.4	NB	Ray Schnittker	Ray Schnittker
13 June 2007	Meadowlands	Qualifier	$0	2/1Q	2:01.1	28.0	NB	Ray Schnittker	Ray Schnittker

== Awards and honours ==
- 2007 Dan Patch Award and Nova Award for Two-Year-Old Trotting Colt of the Year
- 2008 Dan Patch Award for Trotter of the Year
- 2008 Dan Patch Award and Nova Award for Three-Year-Old Trotting Colt of the Year
- Inducted into the Harness Racing Hall of Fame in 2015.
