= Hambletonian Society =

American harness racing organization

- Founded: 1924
- Location: Cranbury, New Jersey, United States
- Field: Horse racing
- President: John Campbell
- First vice-president: Michael G. Kimelman
- Website: hambletonian.com

The Hambletonian Society is a nonprofit horse racing organization that administers major harness racing stakes events in the United States. It is headquartered in Cranbury, New Jersey.

== History ==
=== Founding and early years ===
Founded in 1924, the incorporation of the Hambletonian Society followed the success of the inaugural Hambletonian Stakes, which debuted that year for yearling trotters. Joseph I. Markey originated the idea and maintained it by himself until an organization was formed to handle its administration, afterward becoming an early secretary of the Hambletonian Society.

Officers are elected to the Hambletonian Society Board of Directors for the coming year at an annual meeting, where other business is also addressed. The original officers elected at the first meeting were President Charles W. Leonard, Vice President Paul Kuhn, Treasurer W. M. Wright, and Secretary J. I. Markey. Directors included C. W. Lasell, Harry Burgoyne, T. D. Taggart, F. G. Warden, and Walter T. Candler.

==== Hambletonian Stakes ====
The society's early promotion of the Hambletonian Stakes helped increase the value of young trotters and expanded general interest in harness racing and standardbred horse breeding. The society administers the event's format, venue arrangements, and host-track agreements. In its early years, the sponsoring society offered the privilege of hosting the annual stake to the highest bidding track. Between early December 1925 and January 1, 1926, the Hambletonian Society solicited bids from racing and fair associations for the first race. In the view of Hambletonian Society officials, American county fairs offered the ideal setting for the race, as they attracted audiences interested in agriculture and allied pursuits, like horse breeding. Its first sponsored race was held in 1926 at the New York State Fair in Syracuse, New York. The society deducted the costs of staging the race from the entrance fees, accrued interest, and other funds added. As of 2025, the purse totals $1,000,000, the largest in the sport, far above the nearly $75,000 offered at the inaugural race in 1926.

=== Expansion and development ===
In 1977, the Hambletonian Society was awarded the USHWA Proximity Award for contributions to the sport of harness racing.

The Hambletonian Society announced the creation of the Breeders Crown in late January 1984 under the direction of former president Max Hempt. By 1991, the society administered the Hambletonian and the Breeders' Crown series while managing several other stakes events.

=== Modern era ===
The Hambletonian Society currently administers 164 major harness racing events conducted at 15 North American racetracks within eight state and provincial jurisdictions. Its current headquarters is in Cranbury, New Jersey. Former harness racing driver John Campbell is the president and CEO.

The organization became a member of the American Horse Council in 2024.

== Major events ==
- Hambletonian Stakes
- Hambletonian Oaks
- Breeders Crown

== Past presidents ==
- Charles W. Leonard (1924–1925)
- William Monroe Wright (1926–1931)
- Joseph J. Mooney (1932–1944)
- E. Roland Harriman (1945–1965)
- Max C. Hempt (1966–1984)
- Hugh A. Grant Jr. (1985–1997)
- Tom Charters (1998–2016)
- John Campbell (2017–current)

== See also ==
- Harness racing
