= John Campbell (harness racing) =

Canadian harness racing driver

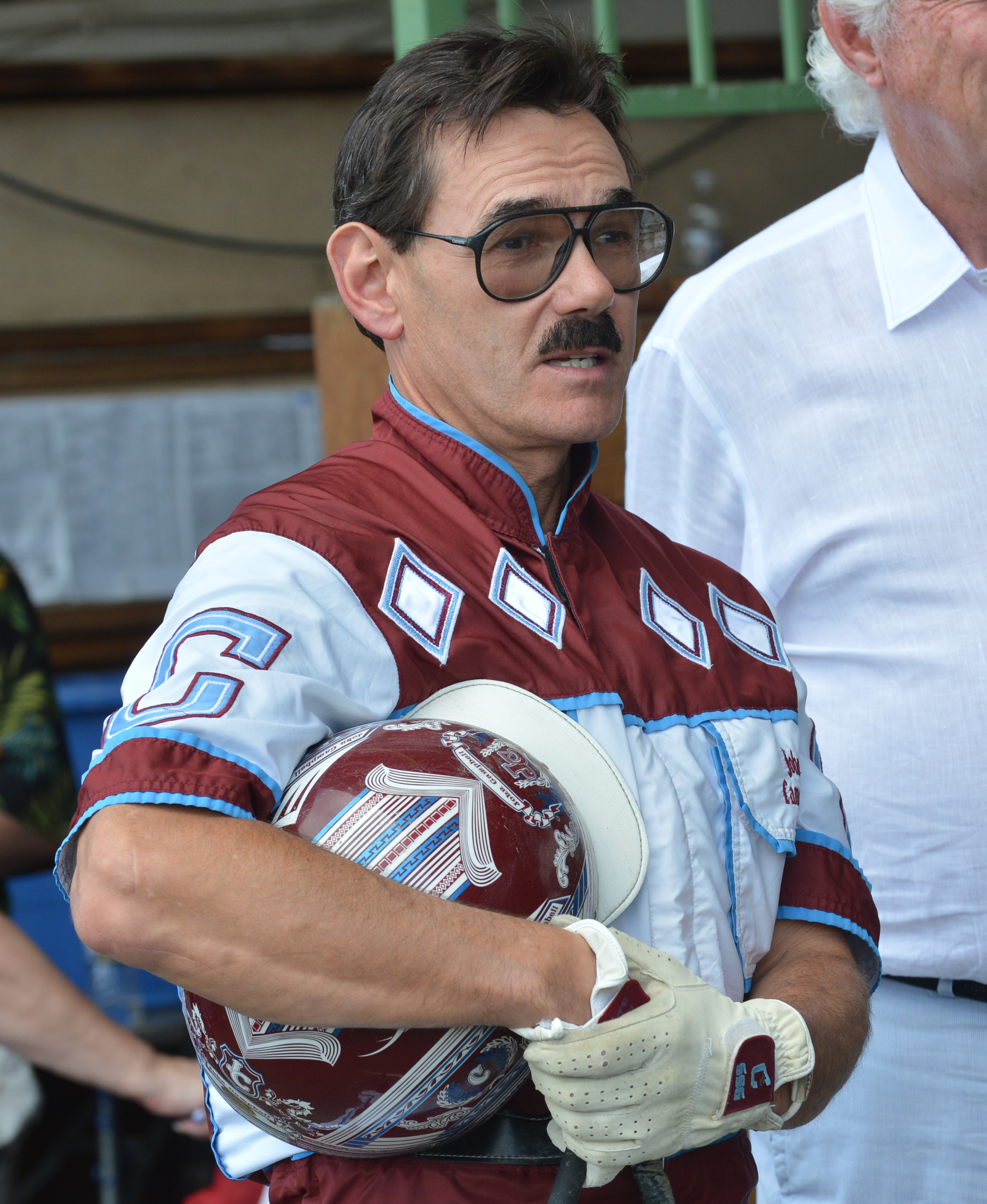
- John Campbell at Meadowlands track, 2013

Personal information
- Born: April 8, 1955 Ailsa Craig, Ontario, Canada
- Occupation: Harness racing driver

Horse racing career
- Sport: Horse racing

Major racing wins
- Meadowlands Pace (1982, 1989, 1994, 1995, 1999, 2001, 2002) †; Canadian Trotting Classic (1983, 2010); Maple Leaf Trot (1983, 1987); Adios Pace (1984, 1987, 1992, 1993, 1994, 1995, 2002, 2003) †; Breeders Crown Open Trot (1985, 1988, 1989, 1994, 1997, 2008) †; Little Brown Jugette (1985, 1989, 1992,1998, 2016) †; Art Rooney Pace (1990, 1993, 1994, 1999) †; North America Cup (1991, 1994, 1995, 1996, 1997, 1999) †; Breeders Crown Open Pace (1992, 2002, 2003, 2011, 2014) †; Betsy Ross Mares Invitational Pace (2008, 2015) U.S. Trotting Triple Crown wins: Hambletonian Stakes (1987, 1988, 1990, 1995, 1998, 2006) †; Yonkers Trot (1987, 1998, 2014); Kentucky Futurity (1989, 1992, 1993, 1994, 1997, 2004, 2007, 2014) † U.S. Pacing Triple Crown wins: Little Brown Jug (1982, 1993, 1995); Cane Pace (1985, 1989, 1990, 2002, 2004) †; Messenger Stakes (1986, 1987, 1990, 1994, 1995, 1998, 2000, 2004) †: † denotes record

Racing awards
- Harness Tracks of America Driver of the Year (1983, 1988, 1990)

Honours
- Canadian Horse Racing Hall of Fame (1987); U. S. Harness Racing Hall of Fame (1990); Little Brown Jug Wall of Fame (1996); Meritorious Service Medal (Canada) (2000); Canada's Sports Hall of Fame (2009)

Significant horses
- Art Major, Cam's Card Shark, David's Pass, Glidemaster, Life Sign, Mack Lobell; Muscles Yankee, Nuncio, Pine Chip; Peace Corps, Precious Bunny, The Panderosa
- Updated on October 14, 2016

John Duncan Campbell (born April 8, 1955, in Ailsa Craig, Ontario) is a retired Canadian harness racing driver. He earned induction into the U.S. Harness Racing Hall of Fame, the Canadian Horse Racing Hall of Fame, and Canada's Sports Hall of Fame.

== Early life ==
John Campbell, his father Duncan, and his brother Jim were prominent Standardbred horsemen. Duncan raised his family near London, Ontario, with sons Ray and Jack. Jack's sons, John and Jim Campbell, followed in the family tradition, as did Ray's son, Robert, a trainer and driver.

== Career ==
Campbell is widely regarded as the greatest driver in harness racing history, having amassed 11,058 career wins and nearly $304 million in purse earnings. His earnings surpass those of any active driver or jockey, and he won more prize money at The Meadowlands Racetrack than any other driver or jockey in North America, a record that cements his unparalleled legacy in the sport.

The 1976 opening of The Meadowlands Racetrack in East Rutherford, New Jersey, known as the Big M, transformed harness racing. The one-mile track attracted top horses, trainers, and drivers. Before the 1970s, horses typically raced in single file until the homestretch. Owners or trainers usually drove the horses. The Meadowlands introduced the “catch-driver,” a younger, lighter, and more athletic driver who increased race speeds. Campbell dominated as a catch-driver in the late 1970s, 1980s, and 1990s, pioneering the role now common among top drivers.

In 1990, at age 35, Campbell became the youngest driver elected to the U.S. Harness Racing Hall of Fame. He also joined the Canadian Horse Racing Hall of Fame and the London, Ontario, Sports Hall of Fame in its inaugural class of 2002.

Campbell won the Hambletonian Stakes a record six times, with his final victory in 2006 driving Glidemaster. On July 12, 2008, he secured his 10,000th career win, guiding Share the Delight to victory in the sixth race at The Meadowlands Racetrack.

Campbell retired from driving in 2017. Before retiring, the Hambletonian Society, a nonprofit organization that administers major harness racing events and promotes Standardbred breeding, unanimously elected him president and CEO.

== Personal life ==
Campbell resides in River Vale, New Jersey.
