= Always B Miki =

American Standardbred racehorse

- Breed: Standardbred
- Sire: Always a Virgin
- Grandsire: Western Ideal
- Dam: Artstopper
- Damsire: Artsplace
- Sex: Stallion
- Foaled: 2011
- Country: United States
- Colour: Bay
- Breeder: Roll The Dice Stable
- Owner: Bluewood Stable, Roll The Dice Stable et al.
- Trainer: Joe Holloway; Jimmy Takter (2015–6)
- Record: 53: 30–13–3
- Earnings: $2,719,368
- Gait: Pace
- Driver: David Miller
- Mile record: 1:46 0/0 (World Record)

Major wins
- Tattersalls Pace (2014); Monument Circle Pace (2014); American-National Aged Pace (2015); Gold Cup Invitational Pace (2016); Ben Franklin Free-For-All Pace (2016); William R. Haughton Memorial Pace (2016); Jim Ewart Memorial Invitational Pace (2016); TVG Free For All Pace (2016) Breeders Crown wins: Breeders Crown Open Pace (2015, 2016)

Awards
- Harness Horse of the Year (2016); Dan Patch Pacer of the Year Award (2016); Dan Patch Award for Older Male Pacer (2016)

Always B Miki (foaled 2011) is a Champion American Standardbred pacer. As a younger horse, he raced mainly at Hoosier Park in Indiana but came to national prominence in his three-year-old season. Favored to win the final of the Breeders Crown 3YO Colt & Gelding Pace, the colt fractured his leg before the race and needed to undergo surgery. After a long layoff, he returned to win the 2015 Breeders Crown Open Pace. At age five, he won several major races and set multiple speed records including a world record of 1:46 at The Red Mile. He received the 2016 Dan Patch Award for Harness Horse of the Year.

== Background ==
Always B Miki is a bay horse with a white star on his forehead and a white coronet on his left hind leg. He was bred by Joe Hurley's Roll The Dice Stable and was foaled in Gettysburg, Pennsylvania. Hurley also bred Always B Miki's sire Always A Virgin, who earned over $1 million in his career, and dam Artstopper, an unraced daughter of Artsplace. Always B Miki is named after Hurley's wife.

After his third start, Hurley sold a part interest in Always B Miki to Bluewood Stable and Val D'Or Farms. In 2015, his ownership group changed to Bluewood Stable, Roll The Dice Stable and Christina Takter. Jimmy Takter became his trainer, while David Miller took over as his driver in most races. In early October 2016, a "significant interest" was sold to Diamond Creek Farm, at which Always B Miki would stand in retirement. Later in October, All American Harnessbreds also bought an interest.

== Racing career ==
=== 2013: two-year-old season ===
Always B Miki won in his racing debut on July 12, 2013, at the Meadowlands in a $12,500 pace for 2-year-old colts and geldings. He then raced mainly at Hoosier Park where he won an elimination for the Indiana Sire Stakes and finished third in two finals. He ended the year with two wins, four seconds and three thirds from twelve starts.

=== 2014: three-year-old season ===
As a 3-year-old, Always B Miki started the year at Hoosier Park, winning several Indiana Sire Stakes Finals, the Super Final and the Monument Circle. At The Red Mile, he won a division of the Tattersalls Pace and a division of the Grand Circuit Stake, while at Mohawk Racetrack in Ontario, he won a division of the Somebeachsomewhere. He also finished second to He's Watching in the Meadowlands Pace even though he started from post nine and lost considerable ground racing three to four wide at times. The time for the race was a world-record-equaling 1:46.4.

Always B Miki then won his elimination heat for the Breeders Crown 3YO Colt & Gelding Pace but had to be scratched out of the final when he went lame during the warm-up. Further examination showed that he had fractured the long (P1) pastern of his left hind leg when he kicked the wall of his paddock before the race. He subsequently underwent surgery in which four screws were inserted in the bone. He finished the season with 12 wins from 19 starts.

=== 2015: four-year-old season ===
Now conditioned by Jimmy Takter, Always B Miki resumed training but then injured his other hind leg in May. "You've got to be patient with them," said Takter. "An injury takes time, and you have to listen to him [the horse]. He did very well; he was standing in his stall for a long time, and a lot of horses get frustrated doing that. He was able to keep his weight, so it’s a heck of a story really."

He finally returned on October 3 at Hoosier Park in an Indiana Sire Stakes elimination, winning in 1:49. He then won his elimination for the Breeders Crown Open Pace in 1:49.4. In the final at Woodbine Racetrack, Always B Miki won convincingly by 5 1/2 lengths in 1:49.3 over a sloppy track. He then finished his season by winning the American-National Aged Pace at Balmoral Park in 1:49.1. "He's a very sensible horse and you can do almost anything with him," said Miller. "He's got incredible athletic ability and has handled that ability quite well." He finished the season with four wins from four starts with earnings of $301,210.

=== 2016: five-year-old season ===
Always B Miki trained well over the winter, leaving Takter feeling optimistic about the upcoming season. "One of the more powerful horses I ever saw was Somebeachsomewhere and this horse has that kind of power," said Takter. "He makes it look easy. He's definitely in a class with the best that ever lived. I know that for sure. If I can keep him good and healthy and sound I think he's going to make a big impact in the sport."

Always B Miki started his five-year-old campaign on April 23, 2016, in a $25,000 Open Handicap at the Meadowlands. Racing in last through the early fractions, he made a strong move in the stretch to finish second by a head. On May 8, he ran in similar company but this time led from the start and won in 1:49.1. He made two more starts at the Meadowlands at the $25,000 open handicap level, winning one and finishing second in the other.

Always B Miki then traveled to Mohawk Raceway where he was made the 1–5 favorite for the Can$100,000 Gold Cup Invitational Pace on June 18. He raced in sixth for the first quarter-mile then moved to the outside and into fourth in the second quarter. Turning into the homestretch, he went wide and swept to the lead to win by 3 1/2 lengths. His time of 1:47.1 was not only a personal best, it was the fastest mile ever paced in Canada.

Always B Miki next headed to Pocono Downs where he won his elimination heat for the Ben Franklin in 1:47, a new career best and tied with the world record on a 5/8-mile track. In the $500,000 final on July 2, he faced off for the first time with the two other leading older pacers: Wiggle It Jiggleit, the 2015 Harness Horse of the Year, and Freaky Feet Pete. Wiggle It Jiggleit went to the early lead but Always B Miki was urged alongside as they moved down the stretch for the first time. The two horses then dueled down the backstretch, pacing the third quarter in 26.2 seconds. Turning into the final stretch, Wiggle It Jiggleit started to give way but Freaky Feet Pete then mounted his drive after getting an energy-saving "pocket trip". At the finish line, Always B Miki won by 3/4 lengths in 1:47, equaling his career best. "He is the best pacer of all-time," said Takter. "They all raced fantastic. The track was really not as fast as it was last week. It is a colder evening. If it was a warm evening, I think they would have gone a second faster."

On July 16, Always B Miki's started in the William R. Haughton Memorial Pace, paced at the unusual distance of 1 1/8 miles. Despite facing both Wiggle It Jiggleit and Freaky Feet Pete, he was the 2–5 favorite in the $471,800 race. Wiggle It Jiggleit again took the early lead but Always B Miki swept by with a decisive move down the backstretch. His time of 2:01.1 was a world record for the distance.

After winning four straight, Always B Miki then lost his next three starts, finishing fourth in the US Pacing Championship at the Meadowlands to Shamballa and second to Wiggle It Jiggleit in both the Dan Patch and Canadian Pacing Derby. On September 10, he travelled to Scioto Downs for the $225,000 Jim Ewart Memorial, where despite the losing streak he was made the 4–5 favorite. Wiggle It Jiggleit went to the early lead and was then joined by Always B Miki down the backstretch. Despite a sloppy track, the two set rapid fractions, completing the half mile in 53 seconds. They continued their duel around the track with Always B Miki prevailing by 3/4 lengths in 1:47, setting a track record and again tying the world record for a 5/8-mile track.

On September 24, Always B Miki returned to his home track in Indiana for the Hoosier Park Pacing Derby. As the prohibitive 1–20 favorite, Always B Miki took advantage of the number one post position and cruised to a two length victory over Freaky Feet Pete. In the Dayton Pacing Derby on September 30 though, he was upset by Wiggle It Jiggleit, who changed tactics and closed from behind the early pace set by Always B Miki to win by a nose.

==== World Record 1:46 ====
On October 9, Always B Miki entered the Allerage Farms open pace at the Red Mile in Lexington. A one-mile oval with banked turns, the Red Mile is known as one of the fastest tracks in the sport so a world record was viewed as a possibility. However, Takter was concerned because the horse was not accustomed to racing during the daytime. "He didn’t warm up well," he said. "He was scared of shadows. I was so nervous before (the race) and I never get nervous like that, but I was."

Shamballa went to the early lead and paced the first quarter in :26.1. Turning into the backstretch, Always B Miki was shown the whip and surged to the lead, completing the half mile in :52.2. Miller then gave him a slight breather, but he still completed three-quarters of a mile in 1:19.4. There was a loud roar from the crowd, sensing history in the making. Entering the stretch, Always B Miki again surged forward, completing the final quarter in :26.1 and the mile in an "epic" time of 1:46. This broke the previous race world record of 1:46.4 held by four horses (Somebeachsomewhere, He's Watching, Warrawee Needy and Holborn Hanover). It also broke the time trial world record of 1:46.1 set in 1993 by Cambest. "He felt good the whole way," said Miller. "He's an incredible horse who does incredible things."

"He's a big horse," said Takter, "but you're not going to see everything inside. He has probably the best lungs ever, the biggest heart ever and the smartest horse ever. He never pulls. It's mechanical."

His record of 1:46 was beaten on July 16, 2022, by Bulldog Hanover.

==== Final races ====
Always B Miki won his next start on October 21, an elimination heat for the Breeders' Crown at the Meadowlands, by four lengths despite drawing the tenth post position. In the $421,000 final on October 28, Wiggle It Jiggleit went to the early lead with Always B Miki tucked behind in the pocket. In the third quarter, Always B Miki swung to the outside and the two horses battled for the lead until Always B Miki finally started to pull away near the finish line. "For entertainment," said Takter, "to see two great horses fighting side by side down the stretch, for me it was one of the best races I've seen."

Always B Miki made his final start in the TVG Free For All Pace final on November 12 at the Meadowlands. He rated behind the early pace then accelerated at the head of the stretch and pulled away to win by 4 1/4 lengths. He finished the year with twelve wins and five second-place finishes from 18 starts. In addition to his world record 1:46 set on a one-mile track, he tied the world record for a five-eighths oval of 1:47 an "unprecedented" three times. He received Dan Patch Awards for Harness Horse of the Year, Pacer of the Year and Champion Older Pacer.

=== Summary ===
Year	Age	Starts	Win	Place	Show	Earnings	Speed Record	Ref
2013	2	12	2	4	3	$135,384	1:53.1	
2014	3	19	12	4	–	$791,482	1:47.4	
2015	4	4	4	–	–	$301,210	1:48.1	
2016	5	18	12	5	–	$1,487,292	1:46.0 (Note: World record)	
Overall		53	30	13	3	$2,719,368	1:46.0	

== Retirement ==
Always B Miki was retired to stud at Diamond Creek Farm in Pennsylvania for an initial fee of $12,500. He is expected to breed with 140 mares during his first year, including the 2014 Harness Horse of the Year JK She'salady.

== Pedigree ==
Pedigree of Always B Miki, stallion, 2011
Sire Always a Virgin 2004	Western Ideal; 1995	Western Hanover	No Nukes
Sire Always a Virgin 2004	Western Ideal; 1995	Western Hanover	Wendymae Hanover
Sire Always a Virgin 2004	Western Ideal; 1995	Leah Almahurst	Abercrombie
Sire Always a Virgin 2004	Western Ideal; 1995	Leah Almahurst	Liberated Angel
Sire Always a Virgin 2004	Neverhaveneverwill; 1995	Big Towner	Gene Abbe
Sire Always a Virgin 2004	Neverhaveneverwill; 1995	Big Towner	Tiny Wave
Sire Always a Virgin 2004	Neverhaveneverwill; 1995	Keystone Wallis	Albatross
Sire Always a Virgin 2004	Neverhaveneverwill; 1995	Keystone Wallis	Steel Wool
Dam Artstopper 2003	Artsplace; 1988	Abercrombie	Silent Majority
Dam Artstopper 2003	Artsplace; 1988	Abercrombie	Bergdorf
Dam Artstopper 2003	Artsplace; 1988	Miss Elvira	Albatross
Dam Artstopper 2003	Artsplace; 1988	Miss Elvira	Ladalia Hanover
Dam Artstopper 2003	Aintnostopme; 1993	Big Towner	Gene Abbe
Dam Artstopper 2003	Aintnostopme; 1993	Big Towner	Tiny Wave
Dam Artstopper 2003	Aintnostopme; 1993	Suave Almahurst	Bret Hanover
Dam Artstopper 2003	Aintnostopme; 1993	Suave Almahurst	Savilla Song

Always B Miki is inbred 3 x 3 to Big Towner, meaning Big Towner appears twice in the third generation of Always B Miki's pedigree. Always B Miki is also inbred 4 x 4 to Albatross and 4 x 3 to Abercrombie.
