= Bulldog Hanover =

Harness racing horse

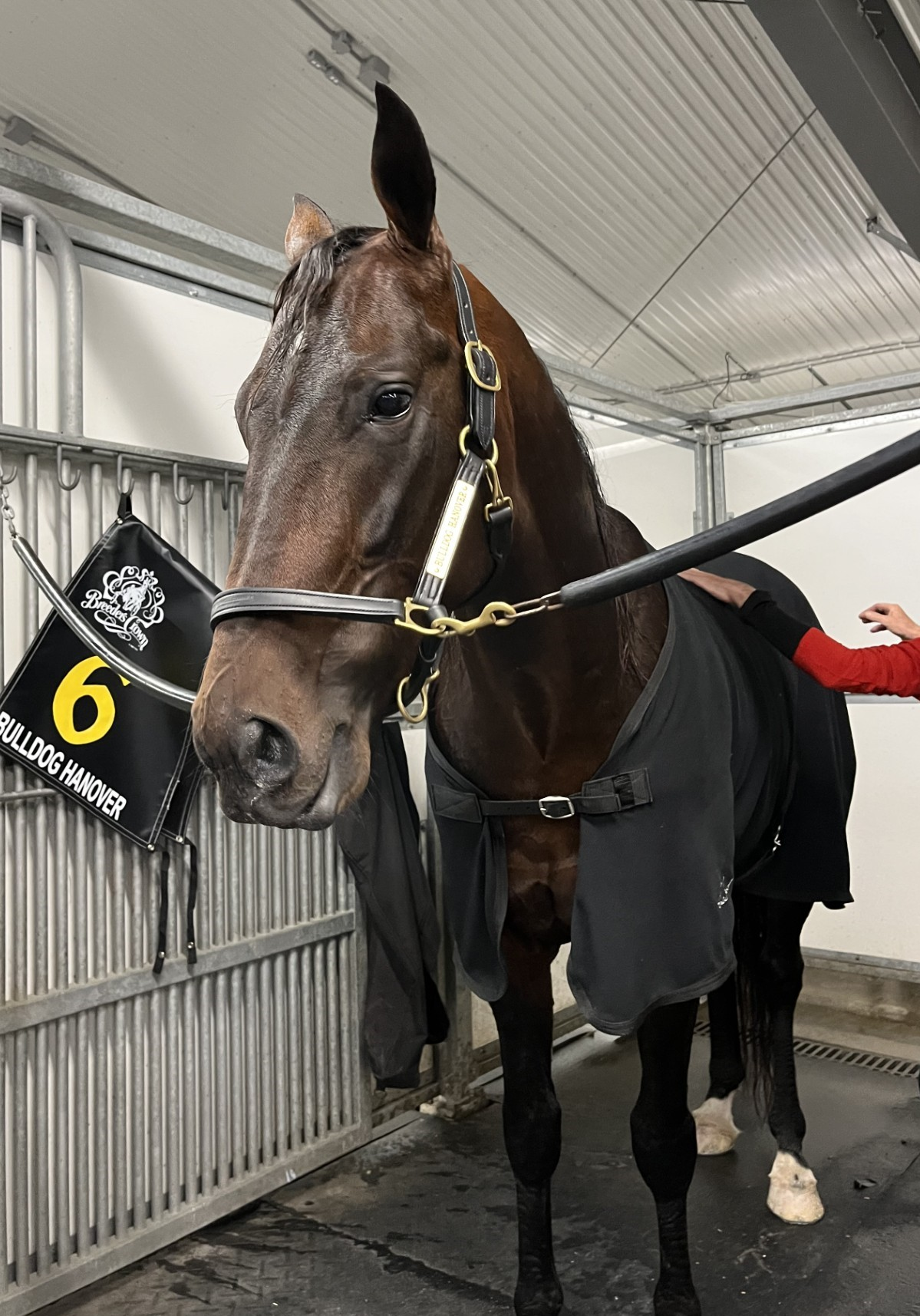
- Bulldog Hanover at Woodbine Mohawk Park in 2022
- Breed: Standardbred
- Sire: Shadow Play
- Grandsire: The Panderosa
- Dam: Bjs Squall
- Damsire: Artsplace
- Sex: Stallion
- Foaled: 2018; Hanover, Pennsylvania
- Colour: Bay
- Breeder: Hanover Shoe Farms
- Owner: Jack Darling, Brad Grant
- Trainer: Jack Darling
- Record: 37: 28-4-1
- Earnings: $2,789,741
- Gait: Pace
- Driver: Dexter Dunn, Jody Jamieson
- Mile record: 1:45 4/5 (World Record)
- Groom: John Mallia

Major wins
- Somebeachsomewhere Stakes (2021) Monument Circle (2021) Roll With Joe Stakes (2022) Graduate Series Final (2022) William R. Haughton Memorial Pace (2022) Dan Patch Stakes (2022) Canadian Pacing Derby (2022) Hoosier Park Pacing Derby (2022) Dayton Pacing Derby (2022) Breeders Crown Open Pace (2022) TVG Open (2022)

Awards
- Dan Patch Horse of the Year (2022) Dan Patch Pacer of the Year Award (2022) Dan Patch Award for Older Male Pacer (2022) Stan F. Bergstein-Proximity Achievement Award (2022) Somebeachsomewhere Horse of the Year O'Brien Award for Older Pacing Horse (2022) Cam Fella Award (2022)

Honours
- Canadian Horse Racing Hall of Fame (2023)

Bulldog Hanover (foaled May 21, 2018) is a retired champion Canadian Standardbred racehorse who is known for becoming the first harness horse to complete a mile in under 1:46. He was also the first horse to be unanimously selected as the Dan Patch Horse of the Year. He has been likened to legends Somebeachsomewhere and Niatross and is considered to be among the best harness horses of all time. Bulldog Hanover was inducted into the Canadian Horse Racing Hall of Fame in 2023.

== Background ==
Bulldog Hanover is a bay stallion with a small white star on his forehead and white hind pasterns. He was bred by Hanover Shoe Farms and was foaled in Hanover, Pennsylvania. His sire, Shadow Play, is a leading Canadian sire and was inducted into the Canadian Horse Racing Hall of Fame in 2022. Dr. Bridgette Jablonsky, the executive vice president of Hanover Shoe Farms at the time, later said that Bulldog Hanover's dam, Bjs Squall, had been "kind of a disappointment" and thought breeding her to an Ontario sire would "give her more of a shot." Bulldog Hanover was purchased by Jack Darling for $28,000 at the Standardbred Horse Sale in Harrisburg, Pennsylvania, on November 6, 2019. According to Jablonsky, Bulldog Hanover was a good-looking and muscular yearling and was included in a list of recommendations to Darling. Darling said the purchase, his only of the sale, was a stroke of luck as he was not intending to buy colts when he attended the sale but happened to look at Bulldog Hanover.

== Racing career ==
=== 2020:Two-year-old season ===
Bulldog Hanover qualified for the first time on June 20, 2020. He made his racing debut on July 6, finishing second in an Ontario Sires Stakes (OSS) Grassroots race at Woodbine Mohawk Park. He later won two OSS Gold races and finished his season by winning the OSS Super Final for two-year-old pacing colts by nine lengths in a new career-best time of 1:50.2.

Overall, he won four of six races and earned $248,850 and was named a finalist for Two-year-old Pacing Colt of the Year at the annual O'Brien Awards. Jody Jamieson drove him in every race.

=== 2021: Three-year-old season ===
Right before the start of his sophomore year, Jack Darling received an offer for the horse from Determination but declined, and then rejected an improved bid shortly after. Two days later, Darling sold half of the stake in the horse to well-known Ontario horse owner Brad Grant. Bulldog Hanover finished first in qualifiers on May 28 and June 3 before beginning his three-year-old year with a loss at Woodbine Mohawk Park on June 12. He bounced back to win an OSS Gold event on July 3 and then finished third in the next leg of the competition on July 25 at Georgian Downs. He then won two OSS Golds in a row back at Woodbine Mohawk Park in August before taking the Somebeachsomewhere Stakes, seen as a preview race to the following week's North America Cup, on August 28 at the same venue in a new best time of 1:48.2.

Bulldog Hanover won his elimination for the $1,000,000 North America Cup, Canada's richest harness race, on September 6 but finished fourth in the final on September 11. The stallion finished second in his final two Canadian starts of the year, an OSS Gold and the OSS Super Final on September 25 and October 16, respectively.

Darling sent Bulldog Hanover to Indiana to race at Harrah's Hoosier Park for the rest of the season, where the horse won four consecutive races. In his second start in the United States on November 5, he tied the stakes record of 1:48.3 when he won the $220,000 Monument Circle by four lengths with John De Long driving. Jody Jamieson had driven the horse in every prior start.

He finished the season with 10 wins in 15 starts and earned more than $682,000 CAD. He was again nominated for a divisional honour — this time for Three-year-old Pacing Colt of the Year — at the O'Brien Awards but lost to North America Cup winner Desperate Man.

At the end of his 2021 season, Seelster Farms of Lucan, Ontario, announced they would stand the stallion at stud while he raced in 2022.

=== 2022: Four-year-old season ===
Bulldog Hanover began his four-year-old year with a pair of winning qualifiers on April 30 and May 7 and won his seasonal debut in an elimination for the Charles Juravinski Memorial Cup at Flamboro Downs on May 15. He lost the $273,500 final, finishing fourth in one of his two losses that year.

His next start, a victory in the Graduate Series at Woodbine Mohawk Park on June 4, began an 11-race winning streak. He remained at the track for another week to win a $65,000 Free-for-All on June 11 before shipping to New Jersey to compete in a string of stakes races at The Meadowlands.

==== "22 Days That Changed Harness Racing" ====
The move was facilitated by a temporary stable change to trainer Noel Daley. Dexter Dunn thereafter replaced Jody Jamieson, who had driven Bulldog Hanover in every race except those in Indiana to that point, as the horse's main driver.

Bulldog Hanover set a new career best time of 1:47 on June 25 in the next leg of the Graduate Series. One week later, in the Roll With Joe on July 2, he became the third horse ever to complete a race in 1:46 as he won by a length-and-three-quarters. He nearly equaled the feat on July 9, when he won the $250,000 Graduate Series Final in 1:46.1, prompting further speculation he may break 1:46 in the following week's William R. Haughton Memorial Pace.

===== 1:45.4 world record =====
Bulldog Hanover entered the $500,000 Haughton Memorial on July 16 as the odds-on favourite and started the race from post seven. The field was filled with stakes winning horses, including Rockyroad Hanover, Tattoo Artist, and Abuckabett Hanover. Driven by Dexter Dunn, he took the lead nearly halfway through the race and completed the first three-quarters in 1:20.3. He then paced the last quarter mile in :25.1 and stopped the clock in 1:45.4, becoming the first harness horse in history to complete a mile faster than 1:46.

The record-breaking victory earned the horse mainstream media attention and was widely acclaimed in harness racing's press. Harold Howe of The Harness Edge called Bulldog Hanover's stint at The Meadowlands "22 days that changed harness racing."

==== Later season ====
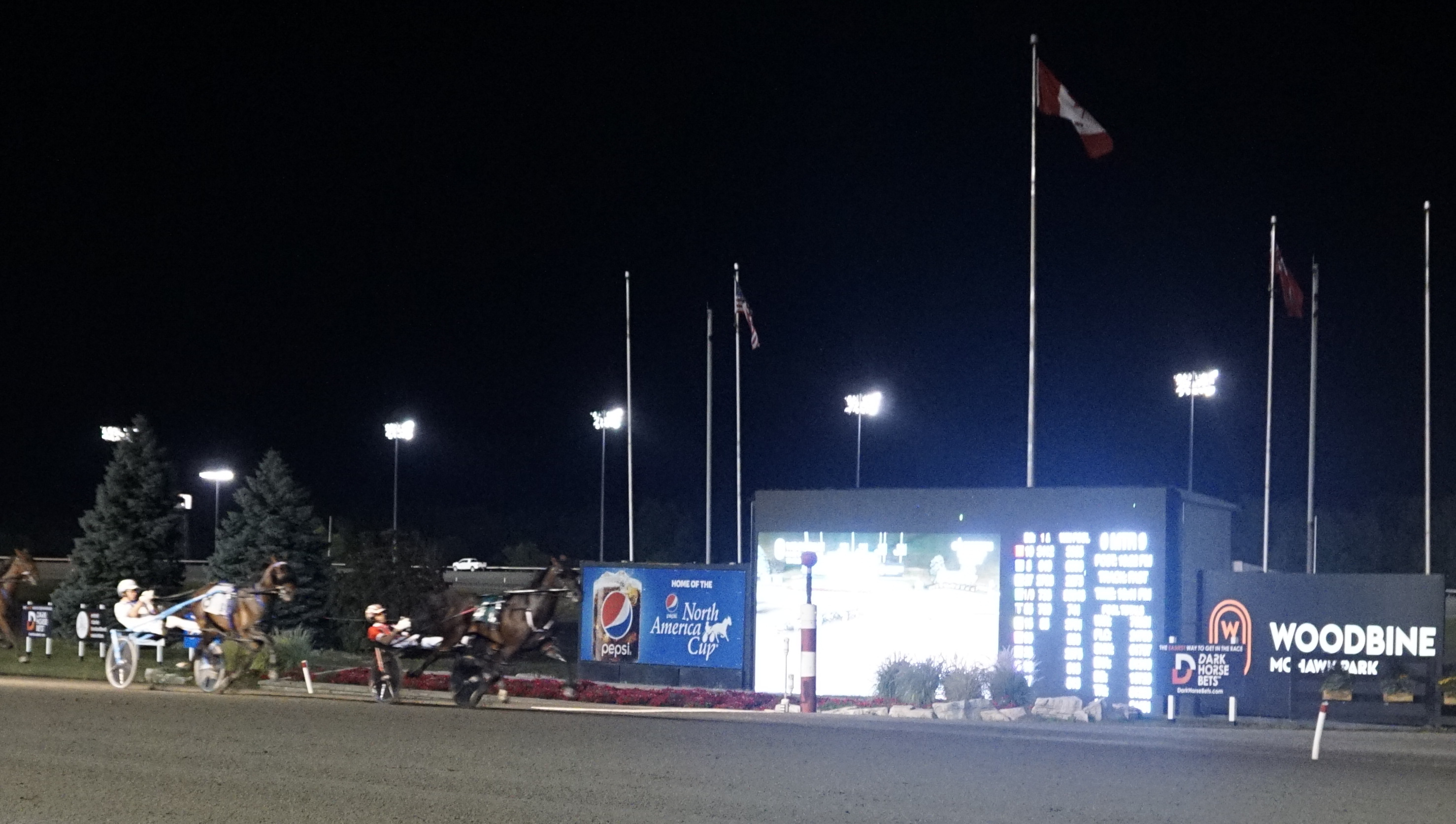
Bulldog Hanover winning the Canadian Pacing Derby at Woodbine Mohawk Park

Bulldog Hanover got two weeks off before rerouting to Harrah's Hoosier Park. There, he won the $315,000 Dan Patch Stakes on August 12 with a time of 1:48.1. He then returned home to Ontario to compete in the Canadian Pacing Derby. After winning his elimination easily on August 27, he equaled the fastest mile in Canadian history as he won the $650,000 final on September 3 in 1:46.4. This made him only the second horse in history to complete a mile faster than 1:47 in Canada.

In his next start on September 23, he broke the track record at Harrah's Hoosier Park as he won the $200,000 Hoosier Park Pacing Derby by six lengths in 1:46.3. It was the fifth time Bulldog Hanover raced faster than 1:47, which had been done on only 11 other occasions before his 2022 season.

Bulldog Hanover won the $250,000 Dayton Pacing Derby on October 1 at Dayton Raceway, again by open lengths, for his 11th consecutive win. He then went to The Red Mile for the $153,000 Allerage on October 9, where fans and media anticipated another possible world record. However, his streak came to an end when Allywag Hanover defeated him in a stunning upset, with the former tying the track record and breaking the world record for an aged pacing gelding as he become the fourth horse to complete a mile in 1:46.

Bulldog Hanover then won the $810,000 Breeders Crown Open Pace, one of harness racing's most coveted races, on October 29 at his home track of Woodbine Mohawk Park in front of a large crowd. He moved to the lead at the halfway point and drew away down the stretch to win by three-and-three-quarter lengths and equal his own Canadian record of 1:46.4 for the second time in the season.

Darling announced on November 2 that Bulldog Hanover would race for the last time in the $345,000 TVG Open at The Meadowlands on November 26. He qualified once for fitness at Woodbine Mohawk Park on November 18. The horse then went out a winner as he cruised to victory by two-and-a-quarter lengths in 1:47.3.

In his four-year-old season, Bulldog Hanover won 14 of his 16 races and earned $1,649,906.

==== End-of-year awards ====
On December 19, he was named the third horse to receive the Stan Bergstein-Proximity Achievement Award, the highest honour given out by the United States Harness Writers Association (USHWA). USHWA unanimously named Bulldog Hanover the Older Male Pacer of the Year ten days later. On February 4, 2023, Bulldog Hanover won Older Pacing Horse of the Year, Somebeachsomewhere Horse of the Year, and the Cam Fella Award at the annual O'Brien Awards. On February 19, at the Dan Patch Awards, Bulldog Hanover became the first horse to be unanimously named Horse of the Year. He was also named Pacer of the Year. His awards garnered national media attention in Canada and the United States.

=== Retirement ===
On April 26, 2023, Bulldog Hanover was announced as an inductee into the Canadian Horse Racing Hall of Fame in the Male Horse category for the class of 2023. He was selected over Trotting Triple Crown winner Marion Marauder and top sire Muscle Mass. He was officially inducted on August 9, 2023.

=== Summary ===
Year	Age	Starts	Win	Place	Show	Earnings	Speed Record
2020	2	6	4	1	–	$188,842	1:50.2
2021	3	15	10	2	1	$580,852	1:48.0
2022	4	16	14	1	–	$1,858,210	1:45.4
Overall		37	28	4	1	$2,419,000	1:45.4

== Stud career ==
On November 26, 2022, Seelster Farms announced Bulldog Hanover would stand for a fee of $15,000 in 2023. On December 20, the farm announced his book of mares for the following season full and closed. His first foal, a colt out of the breeding farm's mare Deb, was born on February 1, 2023, at Seelster Farms.

== Pedigree ==
Pedigree of Bulldog Hanover
Sire Shadow Play (2005) p,4,1:47.4 ($1,559,822)	The Panderosa	Western Hanover	No Nukes
Sire Shadow Play (2005) p,4,1:47.4 ($1,559,822)	The Panderosa	Western Hanover	Wendymae Hanover
Sire Shadow Play (2005) p,4,1:47.4 ($1,559,822)	The Panderosa	Daisy Harbor	Coal Harbor
Sire Shadow Play (2005) p,4,1:47.4 ($1,559,822)	The Panderosa	Daisy Harbor	J R Daisy
Sire Shadow Play (2005) p,4,1:47.4 ($1,559,822)	Matts Filly	Matt's Scooter	Direct Scooter
Sire Shadow Play (2005) p,4,1:47.4 ($1,559,822)	Matts Filly	Matt's Scooter	Ellens Glory
Sire Shadow Play (2005) p,4,1:47.4 ($1,559,822)	Matts Filly	Breezes Girl	Warm Breeze
Sire Shadow Play (2005) p,4,1:47.4 ($1,559,822)	Matts Filly	Breezes Girl	Bit Players
Dam Bjs Squall (1998) p,3,1:53.1s ($268,595)	Artsplace	Abercrombie	Silent Majority
Dam Bjs Squall (1998) p,3,1:53.1s ($268,595)	Artsplace	Abercrombie	Bergdorf
Dam Bjs Squall (1998) p,3,1:53.1s ($268,595)	Artsplace	Miss Elvira	Albatross
Dam Bjs Squall (1998) p,3,1:53.1s ($268,595)	Artsplace	Miss Elvira	Ladalia Hanover
Dam Bjs Squall (1998) p,3,1:53.1s ($268,595)	Lady Ashlee Ann	Camtastic	Cam Fella
Dam Bjs Squall (1998) p,3,1:53.1s ($268,595)	Lady Ashlee Ann	Camtastic	Lushkara
Dam Bjs Squall (1998) p,3,1:53.1s ($268,595)	Lady Ashlee Ann	Preacher Edith	Adios Vic
Dam Bjs Squall (1998) p,3,1:53.1s ($268,595)	Lady Ashlee Ann	Preacher Edith	Keystone Sophie
