= Wiggle It Jiggleit =

American Standardbred racehorse

- Breed: Standardbred
- Sire: Mr Wiggles
- Grandsire: Badlands Hanover
- Dam: Mozzi Hanover
- Damsire: Jennas Beach Boy
- Sex: Gelding
- Foaled: 2012
- Country: United States
- Colour: Dark bay
- Breeder: James Bernstein, Theresa Bantle, Eric Felter & Vincent Tancredi
- Owner: George Teague, Jr. & Teague Racing Partnership
- Trainer: Clyde Francis
- Record: 66: 39-12-6
- Earnings: $3,945,839
- Gait: pace
- Driver: Montrell Teague
- Mile record: 1:47 2/5
- Groom: "Big Mike" Taylor

Major wins
- Meadowlands Pace (2015); Carl Milstein Memorial Pace (2015); Battle of the Brandywine (2015); Matron Male Stakes (2015); Hap Hansen Progress Pace (2015); Battle of Lake Erie; Dan Patch Stakes (2016); Canadian Pacing Derby (2016); Dayton Pacing Derby (2016); Yonkers Invitation Pace (2016) U.S. Pacing Triple Crown wins: Little Brown Jug (2015)

Awards
- Harness Horse of the Year (2015)
- Last updated on January 3, 2017

Wiggle It Jiggleit (foaled March 27, 2012 in Delaware) is a champion American Standardbred racehorse. At the age of three, he won 22 of 26 starts including the Little Brown Jug and Meadowlands Pace, earning him the Dan Patch Award for 2015 Harness Horse of the Year. At age four, he repeatedly dueled with Always B Miki, to whom he finished second in the 2016 Horse of the Year balloting.

== Background ==
Wiggle It Jiggleit was bred by James Bernstein, Theresa Bantle, Eric Felter and Vincent Tancredi. As a weanling, he was bought by George Teague Jr., who owns Teague Stable and Farm in Harrington, Delaware. Previously known as the co-owner and trainer of 2004 Horse of the Year Rainbow Blue, Teague also raced Wiggle It Jiggleit's sire, Mr Wiggles, and dam, Mozzi Hanover.

His pedigree was considered unfashionable, even though Mozzi Hanover was a good racemare who earned $140,000 on the track and Mr. Wiggles won over $1 million, including the $500,000 Hoosier Cup. However, Mr. Wiggles was widely overlooked at stud – Wiggle It Jiggleit was one of only eight horses from his first crop in Indiana. Because expectations for Wiggle It Jiggleit were modest, he was not nominated to the Breeders Crown.

Wiggle It Jiggleit was originally trained by Teague, who also co-owns the gelding with Teague Racing Partnership, managed by Jim Bernstein. Teague's close friend Clyde Francis took over training duties in early 2015. Wiggle It Jiggleit' driver is Teague's son, Montrell. "Team Teague" also includes Teague's sister Brenda, who is his "right hand man", and Wiggle It Jigglit's caretaker "Big Mike" Taylor.

== Racing career ==
Wiggle It Jiggleit won his first start on August 31, 2014, at Pocono Downs by six lengths in a time of 1:51 2/5. He missed the rest of his two-year-old campaign due to soreness. "I didn't want to take any chances and end up hurting him for this year," said Teague in early 2015. "It worked out good. I was able to put him away earlier, get him sounder, and get him back together early this year to see what I've got. He seems as good as some of the better horses I've trained in the past.

=== 2015: three-year-old campaign ===
At age three, Wiggle It Jiggleit raced from January through November, winning at least once a month except in April when he was given a brief layoff. After winning his first four starts of the year, he was the heavy favorite in the $58,000 final of the William 'Buddy' Gilmour Series on March 14 at the Meadowlands. He led every step of the way and won by three lengths. "This is one of the best horses I have ever had, and I trained some good ones," said Teague. "I only put one above him and he may be even better than [Rainbow Blue]. It’s hard not to look to the future and I think it's bright."

Returning to the track on May 2 at the Meadowlands, Wiggle It Jiggleit won the John Simpson Memorial by three lengths as the 1-20 favorite. On May 15, he was the overwhelming favorite in the eighth race at Harrington Raceway before a hometown crowd. He broke well and continued to open up his lead on the field, eventually winning by 14 1/4 lengths. Despite the lack of competition, his time of 1:49 was a new track record and a new world record for a 3-year-old gelding on a half-mile track.

Wiggle It Jiggleit was undefeated coming into the North America Cup at Mohawk Raceway. He won his elimination heat on June 13 by six lengths in 1:49 2/5. As the heavy favorite in the final on June 20, he went to the early lead and paced the first quarter-mile in :25 1/5, the half in :53 3/5 and the three-quarters in 1:21. As they entered the stretch though, Wakizashi Hanover swung out from under cover and pulled by to win by 3/4 lengths. The final time of 1:48 came within a fifth of a second of the track and Canadian record for three-year-olds.

On July 18, Wiggle It Jiggleit faced nine other three-year-olds in the Meadowlands Pace. He battled for the early lead with The Arsenal, then withstood a challenge down the backstretch from Wakizashi Hanover. Turning for home, he drew away to win by 1 3/4 lengths in a new personal best of 1:47 4/5. "This is what everyone dreams of in this business," said Teague. "And I own him too, so it ain't such a bad deal!"

On August 8, Wiggle It Jiggleit was the heavy favorite in the Cane Pace at the Meadowlands, the first leg of the U.S. Pacing Triple Crown. He led for the first three-quarters of a mile while setting very fast fractions, but was overtaken in the stretch to finish fourth. It was the first time in his career that he finished out of the money. On August 14, he rebounded in the $405,000 Carl Milstein Memorial Pace at Northfield Park in Ohio, a half-mile track. He was challenged for the early lead by Wakizashi Hanover and Lost For Words, pacing the first quarter-mile in 26 1/5 seconds. After getting a slight breather, Wiggle It Jiggleit was again challenged by Wakizashi Hanover and Lost For Words in the third quarter. Rounding into the final stretch, Wiggle It Jiggleit began to pull away, winning by 1 1/2 lengths in a time of 1:49 3/5, the second fastest mile ever paced at Northfield Park. "I wasn't after the record," said Montrell Teague. "I was after the money. After a tough loss on Saturday in the Cane Pace, I didn't want to lose this race."

At Mohegan Sun Pocono on August 22, Wiggle It Jiggleit won the $500,000 Battle of the Brandywine by three lengths over Wakizashi Hanover. In a change from his normal pace-setting tactics, Teague rated the gelding in fourth for the first quarter-mile, then gradually made up ground, hitting the lead after three-quarters of a mile. His time of 1:48 tied the world record for a three-year-old gelding pacer on a five-eighths-mile track.

Teague then paid $45,000 to supplement Wiggle It Jiggleit into the 70th Little Brown Jug, the most prestigious race for three-year-old pacers. The Little Brown Jug is the third leg of the Pacing Triple Crown and is a throwback to harness racing's past in that a horse must finish first in two races (usually an elimination heat and the second heat) (Note: If a runner-up in one of the two elimination heats wins the second heat, then a final heat is held with just the heat winners. The winner of the final heat wins the Little Brown Jug.) on the same day to be declared the winner. On September 25 at the Delaware County Fairgrounds, Wiggle It Jiggleit won his elimination heat in a close fought battle with Artspeak in 1:49 2/5, setting a track record. The second heat proved to be an "all-out war" with rival Lost For Words, the winner of the other elimination heat. As the gate pulled away, Lost For Words went straight to the lead while Wiggle It Jiggleit sat back in third. Wiggle It Jiggleit then moved to the outside and pulled alongside Lost For Words. The two dueled for the next quarter, then Lost For Words started to inch away as they moved into the stretch. Looking beaten as they neared the finish line, Wiggle It Jiggleit rallied and won in the final stride by a nose. "He’s the gutsiest horse I’ve ever seen," said Montrell Teague. "He's just special and does not want to lose. He just digs down deep within himself and always finds something more." This race was considered by many to be one of the great harness races of all time.

Wiggle It Jiggleit next finished second in the Indiana Sire Stakes Super Final to Freaky Feet Pete on October 10. As he had not been nominated to the Breeders Crown as a youngster, Teague chose not to pay the large supplemental fee required for that race and instead entered the gelding in the Circle City at Hoosier Park. Wiggle It Jiggleit won handily by 4 1/2 lengths. He then finished behind Freaky Feet Pete in the Monument Circle on October 30.

In the Matron Male Stakes at Dover Downs on November 12, Wiggle It Jiggle It let Wakizashi Hanover take the early lead, then took command down the backstretch and won by 2 1/2 lengths. He made his last start of the year in the $300,000 Hap Hansen Progress Pace, leading from start to finish. He won by 3 1/2 lengths in a time of 1:48 2/5.

Wiggle It Jiggleit finished the year having won 22 of 26 starts with earnings of more than $2 million. He was named the Harness Horse of the Year, receiving 130 out of 136 votes. He was also named the Pacer of the Year and Champion three-year-old pacer. "He's just been an incredible horse," said Teague. "I don't know of too many horses that can start racing in January when there's snow on the ground and go almost to December and still be this good and competitive. He's a rarity." Teague received the Dan Patch Owner of the Year Award, Montrell Teague received the Rising Star Award and "Big Mike" Taylor was Caretaker of the Year.

=== 2016: four-year-old season ===
Wiggle It Jiggleit began his four-year-old campaign with a win in a $60,000 invitational pace at Dover Downs on March 28, 2016.

On May 21, Wiggle It Jiggleit traveled to Northfield Park in Ohio for the $200,000 Battle of Lake Erie in which he was the second betting choice to Freaky Feet Pete, who had won nine straight races. Wiggle It Jiggleit led from the start and won by 4 1/4 lengths in 1:49 4/5.

In the $500,000 Ben Franklin Pace at Pocono Downs on July 2, he faced off for the first time with Always B Miki, who had won the 2015 Breeders Crown Open Pace. Wiggle It Jiggleit went to the early lead but Always B Miki was urged alongside as they moved down the stretch for the first time. The two horses then dueled down the backstretch, pacing the third quarter in 26.2 seconds. Turning into the final stretch, Wiggle It Jiggleit started to give way and eventually finished third.

Wiggle It Jiggleit rebounded on July 9 with a win in the $250,000 Graduate Series Final at the Meadowlands, setting a personal best time of 1:47 2/5. He then finished third behind Always B Miki in the $471,800 William R. Haughton Memorial at the Meadowlands on July 16. At Saratoga Raceway on July 24, Wiggle It Jiggleit won the $260,000 Joe Gerrity Jr. Memorial Pace after being carried three-wide on the first turn.

In the US Pacing Derby on August 6, both Wiggle It Jiggleit and Always B Miki were upset by Shamballa. On August 12, Wiggle It Jiggleit again met up with Always B Miki in the $325,000 Dan Patch Stakes at Hoosier Park. Wiggle It Jiggleit took the early lead but let Always B Miki move by in the second-quarter. Relaxing in the pocket for the third quarter, Wiggle It Jiggleit found a gap on the rail and pulled ahead down the stretch. "He's always been an intelligent horse, but the older he gets the more he has calmed down," said Teague. "He's even better in the winner's circle now and as long as you keep him checked up, like we did tonight, we even get some pictures of him. This kind of maturity will only improve him."

In the Canadian Pacing Derby at Mohawk Racetrack on September 3, Wiggle It Jiggleit got the inside post position and defeated Always B Miki in a wire-to-wire performance. "You got to take advantage of it (the rail) when you have it," said Montrell Teague. "I showed it tonight – :25.3 (for the opening quarter mile). I think everybody got what I was doing."

Always B Miki got his revenge in the $225,000 Jim Ewart Memorial on September 10 at Scioto Downs in an "epic struggle". Wiggle It Jiggleit went to the early lead and was then joined by Always B Miki down the backstretch. Despite a sloppy track, the two set rapid fractions, completing the half mile in 53 seconds. They continued their duel around the track with Always B Miki prevailing by 3/4 lengths in 1:47 flat, tying the world record for a 5/8-mile track.

On September 19, Wiggle It Jiggleit returned to his hometown track, Harrington Raceway, for the $150,000 Bobby Quillen Memorial Invitational. On a sloppy track, he won by over two lengths in a time of 1:50 flat. On September 30 at Dayton Raceway, he beat Always B Miki for the third time, this time in the $150,000 Dayton Pacing Derby. "Dayton race fans were lined up all along the rail and cheered Wiggle It Jiggleit from the time he entered the track," said the track's race secretary Gregg Keidel. "And it ended up a fantastic race. It was every bit as thrilling as Wiggle It Jiggleit’s win at the Little Brown Jug last year."

On October 15, Wiggle It Jiggleit won Yonkers Raceway's $250,000 Invitational Pace, overcoming an outside position in the starting gate.

Encouraged by the performance, Teague decided to supplement Wiggle It Jiggleit to the Breeders Crown Open Pace on October 28 at the Meadowlands. There he faced off for the last time with Always B Miki, who was coming off a world record performance of 1:46 at the Red Mile in Lexington. Wiggle It Jiggleit went to the early lead and set sensible opening fractions. In the third quarter, Always B Miki swung wide and pulled alongside. The two battled down the stretch with Always B Miki winning in the final strides.

In eight head-to-head meetings, Always B Miki won four races (the Ben Franklin, William Haughton Memorial, Jim Ewart Memorial and Breeders Crown) while Wiggle It Jiggleit won three times (the Dan Patch, Canadian Pacing Derby and Dayton Pacing Derby) (Note: In the US Pacing Derby, Shamballa posted an upset win with Wiggle It Jiggleit finishing second and Always B Miki fourth.) They were expected to face off one last time in the TVG Series Free for All but Wiggle It Jiggleit scratched from the race due to a bone bruise and minor illness. "It is nothing serious, but you can't continue like that," said Teague. "He's made 50 starts over the past two seasons with very few hiccups so we definitely did not want to take any chances to hurt him or his reputation if he was not 100 per cent."

Wiggle It Jiggleit finished second to Always B Miki in the Dan Patch balloting for Harness Horse of the Year. Later, the United States Harness Writers Association presented two awards to his connections. Teague himself received the Good Guy Award for "outstanding cooperation with the media and in helping to showcase the sport." Team Teague as a whole received the Stan Bergstein Proximity Award, which is "presented annually to those who have made outstanding contributions to harness racing."

=== Summary ===
Year	Age	Starts	Win	Place	Show	Earnings	Speed Record	Ref
2014	2	1	1	-	-	$6,500		
2015	3	26	22	3	-	$2,181,995	1:47 4/5	
2016	4	24	15	7	2	$1,719,062	1:47 2/5	
Total (as of December 31, 2016)		51	38	10	2	$3,907,557	1:47 2/5	
