= Confederation Cup =

Confederation Cup may refer to various sports competitions. It most commonly refers to:

- the FIFA Confederations Cup, for International football
- the CAF Confederation Cup, for African club football
- the Confederation Cup Pace, Canadian harness race
