= Breeders Crown Open Pace =

- Class: Grade 1
- Location: North America
- Inaugurated: 1985
- Race type: Harness race for Standardbred pacers

Race information
- Distance: 1 mile (1,609 metres or 8 furlongs)
- Surface: Dirt
- Qualification: 4-year-olds-and-up
- Purse: $600,000 (2025)

The Breeders Crown Open Pace is a Grade 1 harness racing event for Standardbred pacers. It is one part of the Breeders Crown annual series of twelve races for both Standardbred pacers and trotters. The Open Pace for horses age four and older was first run in 1985. It is contested over a distance of one mile. Race organizers have awarded the event to various racetracks across North America.

== Historical race events ==
At the Meadowlands Racetrack in 2009, Won The West set the Open Pace record time of 1:47 flat which was the fastest pacing mile in the entire Breeders Crown series until 2023.

Bulldog Hanover, who had broken the record for the fastest ever mile time for a Standardbred previously in the season, broke the Breeders Crown record in the 2023 edition of the race. He went on to be the first unanimous Horse of the Year.

In 2025, Ervin Hanover set the stakes record while pacing the fastest mile in Canadian history.

== North American locations ==
=== Track & Abbreviation -- State/Province -- times hosted ===
- Meadowlands Racetrack (Mxx) New Jersey (15)
- Mohawk Raceway (Moh) Ontario (6)
- Woodbine Racetrack (Wdb) Ontario (4)
- Hoosier Park (HoP) Indiana (3)
- Pocono Downs (Pcd) Pennsylvania (2)
- Freehold Raceway (Fhl) New Jersey (2)
- The Meadows Racetrack (Mea) Pennsylvania (1)
- Pompano Park (Ppk) Florida (1)
- Scioto Downs (Scd) Ohio (1)
- Roosevelt Raceway (Rr) New York (1)
- Los Alamitos Race Course (Lrc) California (1)
- Freestate Raceway (Fsr) Maryland (1)
- Northfield Park (Nfl) Ohio (1)

== Records ==
Most wins by a driver

- 5 – Michel Lachance (1985, 1989, 1991, 1997, 2000), John Campbell (1992, 2002, 2003, 2011, 2014)

Most wins by a trainer

- 4 – Robert McIntosh (1991, 1992, 1993, 2014)

Stakes record

- 1:46 2/5 – Ervin Hanover (2025)

== Winners of the Breeders Crown Open Pace ==
Year	Winner	Age	Driver	Trainer	Owner	Time	Purse	Track
2025	Ervin Hanover	5	Dexter Dunn	Dave Menary	Pollack Racing	1:46 2/5	$600,000	Moh
2024	Coach Stefanos	4	James MacDonald	Erv Miller	Ken Duffy, D&M Trading II, John Stefanos	1:48 3/5	$600,000	Mxx
2023	Bythemissal	4	Yannick Gingras	Ron Burke	Burke Racing Stable, Eric Good, Rich Lombardo Racing, Weaver Bruscemi	1:48 0/0	$600,000	HoP
2022	Bulldog Hanover	4	Dexter Dunn	Jack Darling	Jack Darling Stables, Brad Grant	1:46 4/5	$600,000	Moh
2021	Ocean Rock	4	Dan Noble	Christi Noble	Sandra S. Burnett	1:48 3/5	$600,000	Mxx
2020	Century Farroh	4	David Miller	Dr. Ian Moore	Century Springs Farms	1:49 0/0	$500,000	HoP
2019	American History	5	Joe Bongiorno	Tony Alagna	Brittany Farms, Marvin Katz, American History Racing	1:48 1/3	$500,000	Wdb
2018	McWicked	4	Brian Sears	Casie Coleman	S S G Stable	1:49 1/3	$530,000	Pcd
2017	Split The House	5	Brett Miller	Chris Oakes	Crawford Farms Racing	1:48 1/1	$421,000	HoP
2016	Always B Miki	5	David Miller	Jimmy Takter	Bluewood Stable, Roll The Dice Stable, Christina Takter	1:49 0/0	$500,000	Mxx
2015	Always B Miki	4	David Miller	Jimmy Takter	Bluewood Stable, Roll The Dice Stable, Christina Takter	1:49 3/5	$518,960	Wdb
2014	Thinking Out Loud	5	John Campbell	Robert McIntosh	R McIntosh Stables, CSX Stables, Al McIntosh Holdings	1:48 3/5	$400,000	Mxx
2013	Foiled Again	9	Yannick Gingras	Ron Burke	Burke Racing Stable, JJK Stable, Wever-Bruscemi	1:49 2/5	$500,000	Pcd
2012	Bettor Sweet	8	David Miller	Thomas Cancelliere	John Cancelliere	1:49 1/5	$500,000	Wdb
2011	Bettor Sweet	7	John Campbell	Thomas Cancelliere	John Cancelliere	1:48 4/5	$501,950	Wdb
2010	Won The West	6	Jim Morrill Jr.	Ron Burke	Strollin Stable, William Robinson, James Koehler	1:49 0/0	$500,000	Pcd
2009	Won The West	5	Jim Morrill Jr.	Ron Burke	Strollin Stable, William Robinson, James Koehler	1:47 0/0	$500,000	Mxx
2008	Mister Big	5	Brian Sears	Virgil Morgan, Jr.	Joseph Muscara, Sr.	1:50 0/0	$532,150	Moh
2007	Artistic Fella	4	Tim Tetrick	Steve Elliott	Joseph Alborano	1:49 2/5	$540,000	Mxx
2006	Lis Mara	4	Brian Sears	Ervin Miller	MJG RAcing Stables & Louis Willinger	1:47 3/5	$500,000	Mxx
2005	Boulder Creek	5	Brian Sears	Mark Silva	Clifford D. Siegel, Lee S. Wasserman, John A. Fodera	1:49 1/5	$605,000	Moh
2004	Boulder Creek	4	Ronald Pierce	Mark Silva	Clifford D. Siegel, Lee S. Wasserman, John A. Fodera	1:48 1/5	$552,500	Mxx
2003	Art Major	4	John Campbell	William Robinson	(Lessee) Blue Chip Bloodstock Inc., James Simpson, Art Major Stable	1:49 4/5	$729,730	Wdb
2002	Real Desire	4	John Campbell	Blair Burgess	Brittany Farms, R. Burgess, K. Olsson Burgess, Perretti Farms	1:48 3/5	$500,000	Mxx
2001	Goliath Bayama	5	Sylvain Filion	Yves Filion	Ecuries NDG	1:48 4/5	$500,000	Mxx
2000	Western Ideal	5	Michel Lachance	Bret Pelling	Brittany Farms	1:48 0/0	$440,000	Mxx
1999	Red Bow Tie	5	Luc Ouellette	Monte Gelrod	Cliff Siegel of TLP Stables, et al.	1:50 0/0	$380,000	Mxx
1998	Red Bow Tie	4	Luc Ouellette	Monte Gelrod	Cliff Siegel of TLP Stables, et al.	1:50 1/5	$340,000	Mxx
1997	Armbro Operative	4	Michel Lachance	Brett Pelling	David McDuffee & Tom Walsh	1:50 3/5	$300,000	Mxx
1996	Jennas Beach Boy	4	William Fahy	Joe Holloway	L & L DeVisser Partnership	1:48 4/5	$300,000	Mxx
1995	Thatll Be Me	4	Roger Mayotte	Robert Young	Robert Young	1:52 4/5	$300,000	Nfl
1994	Village Jiffy	4	Paul MacDonell	William Wellwood	W. Wellwood, H. Charles Armstrong, AFJ Stable, Fred Brunner	1:52 2/5	$334,000	Fhl
1993	Staying Together	4	Bill O'Donnell	Robert McIntosh	Robert Hamather	1:51 1/5	$396,810	Moh
1992	Artsplace	4	John Campbell	Robert McIntosh	George Segal & Brian Monieson	1:52 0/0	$368,100	Moh
1991	Camluck	4	Michel Lachance	Robert McIntosh	New Destiny & Al McIntosh	1:52 1/5	$463,000	Mea
1990	Bays Fella	5	Paul MacDonell	Mike DeMenno	Par-Birdie Stable	1:52 1/5	$273,458	Ppk
1989	Matts Scooter	4	Michel Lachance	Harry J. Poulton	Gordon & Illa Rumpel, Charles Juravinski	1:53 2/5	$278,238	Fhl
1988	Call For Rain	4	Clint Galbraith	Clint Galbraith	Clint & Barbara Galbraith	1:53 2/5	$316,256	Scd
1987	Armbro Emerson	4	Walter Whelan	Brian Burton	Ed Weisz, Light/Heavyweight Stable	1:54 1/5	$359,794	Rr
1986	Forrest Skipper	4	Lucien Fontaine	Lucien Fontaine	Forrest Bartlett	1:53 4/5	$301,350	Lrc
1985	Division Street	4	Michel Lachance	Vinnie Aurigemma	Lachance, Denim, M.E.K. Stable, KLR Stable	1:52 3/5	$309,553	Fsr
