= William R. Haughton Memorial Pace =

Stakes race for pacing standardbred horses

- Location: Meadowlands Racing & Entertainment; East Rutherford, New Jersey
- Inaugurated: 1977 (49 years ago)
- Race type: Standardbred (Pace)
- Website: playmeadowlands.com

Race information
- Distance: 1 1/8 miles (9 furlongs)
- Surface: Dirt
- Track: Left-handed
- Qualification: 4-year-olds
- Purse: $444,000 (2023)

The William R. Haughton Memorial Pace (formerly known as the Governor Alfred E. Driscoll Pace) is a mile and one-eighth race for Standardbred Free-For-All pacers age four and older run annually at Meadowlands Racetrack in East Rutherford, New Jersey.

Currently, the race is held on the same card at the Meadowlands every third Saturday in July, alongside Stanley Dancer Memorial, Mistletoe Shalee, Dorothy Houghton Memorial, Hambletonian Maturity and Miss Versatility, as well as one of the racetrack's most signature events, the Meadowlands Pace.

== Historical race events ==
First run in 1977, the race was known as the Governor Alfred E. Driscoll Pace in honor of Governor of New Jersey, Alfred E. Driscoll. In 1999 it was renamed in honor of legendary driver/trainer William Robert "Billy" Haughton.

From inception through 2015 the race was set at a distance of one mile.

On July 16, 2022, Bulldog Hanover made harness racing history by clocking in the fastest pace mile ever, winning the 2022 race with a time of 1:45 4/5.

== Records ==
Most wins by a driver

- 6 – Michel Lachance (1989, 1990, 1997, 2000, 2003, 2004), David Miller (2006, 2007, 2013, 2016, 2017, 2023)

Most wins by a trainer

- 3 – Joe Holloway (1984, 1985, 1986) & Virgil Morgan, Jr. (2007, 2008, 2013)

Stakes record at 1 1/8 miles

- 2:01 1/5 – Always B Miki (2016; world record)

Stakes record at 1 mile

- 1:45 4/5 – Bulldog Hanover (2022; fastest mile in harness racing history)

== William R. Haughton Memorial winners ==
Year	Winner	Age	Driver	Trainer	Owner	Time	Purse
2023	Charlie May	5	David Miller	Steve Carter	Don Tiger	1:47 1/5	$444,000
2022	Bulldog Hanover	4	Dexter Dunn	Noel M. Daley	Jack Darling Stables Ltd., Bradley Grant	1:45 4/5	$500,000
2021	Allywag Hanover	4	Tood McCarthy	Brett Pelling	Diamond Creek Racing	1:47 1/5	$265,400
2020	Dancin Lou	4	Brian Sears	Tah Camilleri	David C. Kryway	1:47 2/5	$391,300
2019	Lather Up	4	Montrell Teague	Clyde Francis	Gary Iles, Barbara Iles	2:01 1/5	$423,000
2018	Mcwicked	7	Brian Sears	Casie Coleman	S S G Stables	2:02 2/5	$471,100
2017	Mach It So	7	David Miller	Jeffery Bammond, Jr.	Bamond Racing LLC	2:00 4/5	$427,400
2016	Always B Miki	5	David Miller	Jimmy Takter	Bluewood Stable, Roll The Dice Stable, Christina E. Takter	2:01 1/5	$471,800
2015	Mach It So	5	Tim Tetrick	Jeffrey Bamond, Jr.	Bamond Racing	1:48 1/5	$430,600
2014	Sweet Lou	5	Ronald Pierce	Ron Burke	Burke Racing Stable, Weaver Bruscemi LLC, Larry Karr, Phil Collura	1:47 1/5	$463,000
2013	Pet Rock	4	David Miller	Virgil Morgan, Jr.	Frank & Joe Bellino	1:47 0/0	$471,800
2012	Golden Receiver	7	Andy Miller	Mark Harder	Stable 45, Richard Taylor, Stephen Springer, Nina Simmonds	1:48 2/5	$431,400
2011	Alexie Mattosie	5	George Brennan	Nikolas Drennan	Donald Lindsey, Paul Kleinpaste, Dennis Mavrin, William Alempijevic	1:48 1/5	$523,000
2010	Shark Gesture	7	George Brennan	Larry & Ray Remmen	Norman Smiley, Gerald Smiley, TLP Stable	1:48 2/5	$702,500
2009	Shark Gesture	6	Tim Tetrick	Larry & Ray Remmen	Norman Smiley, Gerald Smiley, TLP Stable	1:48 2/5	$688,000
2008	Mister Big	5	Brian Sears	Virgil Morgan, Jr.	Joseph Muscara, Sr.	1:49 0/0	$600,000
2007	Mister Big	4	David Miller	Virgil Morgan, Jr.	Joseph Muscara, Sr.	1:48 2/5	$650,000
2006	Leading X Ample	4	David Miller	William Elliott	Leading X Ample Stable	1:48 2/5	$650,000
2005	Dr No	4	Catello Manzi	William Elliott	Brian Legge, Dr. David Legge, Robert Stewart	1:50 1/5	$700,000
2004	Four Starzzz Shark	6	Michel Lachance	David Sabatelli	Four Starzzz Shark Stable (J. Cohen & M. Sudaley)	1:48 1/5	$700,000
2003	McArdle	4	Michel Lachance	Christopher J. Ryder	TLP Stable	1:50 0/0	$650,000
2002	Four Starzzz Shark	4	Jim Morrill, Jr.	Edward Hart	Four Starzzz Shark Stable (J. Cohen & M. Sudaley)	1:49 3/5	$650,000
2001	Armbro Positive	7	Howard Parker	David Macneill	Perfect World Enterprises	1:49 1/5	$618,000
2000	Western Ideal	5	Michel Lachance	Brett Pelling	Brittany Farms	1:48 3/5	$615,000
1999	Red Bow Tie	5	Luc Ouellette	Monte Gelrod	Clifford Siegel, David Scharf, TLP Stable, D'Elegance Stable IX	1:48 2/5	$600,000
1998	Pacific Fella	5	Catello Manzi	Edward Lohmeyer	Joseph Alborano	1:49 3/5	$250,000
1997	Armbro Operative	4	Michel Lachance	Noel Daley	Thomas Walsh, Jr. & David McDuffee	1:50 0/0	$250,000
1996	Jenna's Beach Boy	4	Bill Fahy	Joe Holloway	Leon P. DeVisser	1:47 3/5	$200,000
1995	Village Jiffy	5	Paul MacDonnell	William Wellwood	Wellwood Stables Inc., Charles Armstrong	1:50 4/5	$200,000
1994	Under Orders	4	Peter Wrenn	William Robinson	Anthony & Joseph Spadafora	1:50 4/5	$200,000
1993	Staying Together	4	Bill O'Donnell	Robert McIntosh	Robert Hamather	1:49 2/5	$205,000
1992	Artsplace	4	John Campbell	Robert McIntosh	Brittany Farms	1:50 3/5	$192,000
1991	Prince Ebony	8	Ronald Pierce	George Patlias	Marinos Bouras	1:50 3/5	$210,000
1990	TK's Skipper	4	Michel Lachance	Nick Sodano	Jerebel Stables (Jerry Dubiner)	1:51 3/5	$211,000
1989	Matt's Scooter	4	Michel Lachance	Harry J. Poulton	Gordon & Illa Rumpel, Charles Juravinski	1:50 1/5	$196,000
1988	Jaguar Spur	4	Richard Stillings	Richard Stillings	Roy Davis & Barberry Farm	1:50 3/5	$200,000
1987	Governors Choice	7	Jim Doherty	Jim Doherty		1:51 3/5	$178,000
1986	Forrest Skipper	4	Lucien Fontaine	Marc Fontaine	Forrest Bartlett	1:51 3/5	$180,000
1985	Tuff Choice	4	John Campbell	Joe Holloway	Shady Stable partnership (Milton Rovine)	1:53 0/0	$174,000
1984	Glen Almahurst	4	Eddie Davis	Joe Holloway	Shady Stable partnership (Milton Rovine)	1:52 1/5	$203,000
1983	Cam Fella	4	Pat Crowe	Pat Crowe	Norman Clements & Norman Faulkner, JEF's Stable	1:53 2/5	$183,000
1982	Genghis Khan	6	Bill O'Donnell	Eddie Cobb	Eddie Cobb, Nevacal Stable, Jet Star Farms	1:53 4/5	$164,000
1981	Royce	4	John Campbell	James Crane	A. & C. Skolnick, J. & P. Crane	1:53 4/5	$193,000
1980	Tijuana Taxi	4	Jim Miller	Jim Miller	Barr M Stable	1:54 3/5	$167,000
1979	Dream Maker	6	Ron Waples	William Robinson	Antonio Chiaravalle	1:54 3/5	$171,000
1978	Whata Baron	6	Lewis D. Williams	Lewis D. Williams	Ed Freeburg	1:54 4/5	$152,000
1977	Rambling Willie	7	Robert Farrington	Robert Farrington	Vivian Farrington & Paul Seibert	1:55 1/5	$186,000
