= Rambling Willie =

American Standardbred racehorse

- Breed: Standardbred
- Sire: Rambling Fury
- Grandsire: Ensign Lad
- Dam: Meadow Belle
- Damsire: Meadow Gold
- Sex: Gelding
- Foaled: 1970
- Died: 1995
- Country: United States
- Colour: Bay
- Owner: 1) Farrington Stable Inc. 2) Vivian Farrington & Paul Seibert
- Trainer: Robert Farrington
- Record: 305: 128-69-43
- Earnings: $2,038,219

Major wins
- General Mad Anthony Stake (1975, 1977); Canadian Pacing Derby (1975, 1976, 1977); U.S. Grand Prix FFA (1975, 1977); Paul Wixom FFA (1975, 1978); U.S. Pacing Championship (1976); Cornell Memorial Pace (1977, 1979); Governor Driscoll Pace (1977); American Pacing Classic (1978); Suburban Downs Derby (1980)

Awards
- North American Champion Aged Pacer (1975, 1976, 1977)

Honors
- United States Harness Racing Hall of Fame (1997); Indiana Standardbred Hall of Fame (2003)
- Last updated on October 20, 2016

Rambling Willie (April 18, 1970 - August 24, 1995) was a harness racing horse, more specifically a bay pacing gelding sired by Rambling Fury and out of Meadow Belle by Meadow Gold.

Rambling Willie was born on a farm in Monroeville, Indiana.

He did not race at age two and as three-year-old was purchased by driver/trainer Robert Farrington for $15,000 who later gifted 50% of the horse to his wife Vivian and sold the other half to Paul Siebert.

He won 128 races in 305 starts, both records, and won the U. S. Pacing Championship in 1976. At the 1975 Canadian Pacing Derby he tied for first in a dead heat with Pickwick Baron, and won outright in 1976 and 1977, setting a best time for the mile of 1:54.3, a world record at the time.

Rambling Willie was "put down" in 1995 because of laminitis (an often fatal hoof disease) and was buried in the Kentucky Horse Park in Lexington, Kentucky where he had resided, on permanent exhibition, in the Park's "Hall of Champions", representing the Standardbred breed.

== Awards and recognition ==
He was voted North American aged pacer of the year in 1975, 1976, and 1977, and he retired in 1983 as the leading Standardbred money winner of all time, earning over $2 million. Most of his earnings came from "overnight" invitational races and "late closer" events that carried only a fraction of the dollar amounts of the traditional two- and three-year-old stakes events that make up the vast majority of the earnings of virtually every other record money-winning racehorse. To this day, considering inflation, his earnings from age 4 and up have not been surpassed in North America.

Rambling Willie sustained "bowed tendons" in both front legs early in his ten-plus-year racing career, as well as other nagging injuries expected in a racehorse competing for so long a period. While racing at Hollywood Park Racetrack in California, he suffered such a severe bout of colic that he was operated on in a last effort to save him, euthanasia being the only alternative. Hollywood Park was inundated with letters and calls from his fans for weeks afterward, and the track released frequent bulletins as his condition progressed. The horse recovered and months later won at long odds.

Rambling Willie was inducted into the United States Harness Racing Hall of Fame in 1997 and into the Indiana Standardbred Hall of Fame in 2003. Upon the horse's death, Bob Farrington, his retired Hall of Fame driver and trainer, was asked what he had seen in Willie that others missed during the early part of his career. Farrington replied in the words of legendary Thoroughbred trainer "Sunny" Jim Fitzsimmons, "The most important thing about a racehorse, you can't see."

A biography of the horse was published: Rambling Willie: The Horse that God Loved! (ISBN 0-910119-42-2).
