= Armbro Dallas =

Standardbred racehorse

- Sire: Abercrombie
- Grandsire: Silent Majority
- Dam: Armbro Trixie
- Damsire: Most Happy Fella
- Sex: Gelding
- Foaled: 1982
- Died: 2001
- Country: North America
- Color: Bay
- Owner: Waples Stable, Archie McNeil, Lothlorien Equestrian (Audrey Thomson Campbell)
- Trainer: Ron Waples
- Record: World record: 1:52 3/5
- Earnings: $1,401,201

Major wins
- Prix de l'Avenir Pace (1984); Batavia Downs Stake (1985); Pilgrim Pace (1985); Gold Cup Invitational Pace (1986)
- Last updated on October 30, 2016

Armbro Dallas (1982–2001) was a standardbred millionaire and world record setting racehorse who competed in harness racing in Canada and the United States. He was trained, driven and co-owned by Canadian and U.S. Hall of Fame inductee, Ron Waples.

Armbro Dallas is best remembered for beating Nihilator and Forest Skipper in the 1985 running of the Pilgrim Pace at Garden State Park Racetrack in New Jersey. Both Nihilator in 1985 and Forest Skipper in 1986 went on to win Harness Horse of the Year honors.

On November 21, 1985 Armbro Dallas set a new world record for gelded pacers with a win at Garden State Park in a time of 1:52 3/5.

Armbro Dallas died at age 19 at the farm of co-owner Ron Waples.
