= Rainbow Blue =

American Standardbred racehorse

- Breed: Standardbred
- Sire: Artiscape
- Grandsire: Artsplace
- Dam: Vesta Blue Chip
- Damsire: On The Road Again
- Sex: Mare
- Foaled: 2001
- Country: United States
- Colour: Bay
- Owner: K And R Racing LLC (Kevin & Ron Fry), Teague Inc.
- Trainer: George Teague, Jr.
- Record: 32: 30-0-1
- Earnings: $1,428,934

Major wins
- Fan Hanover Stakes (2004); Nadia Lobell Pace (2004); Matron Stakes (2004); Breeders Crown 3YO Filly Pace (2004)

Awards
- American Harness Horse of the Year (2004); United States Pacer of the Year (2004); United States 3-year-old Filly Pacer of the Year; Canadian Harness Horse of the Year (2004)

Honors
- United States Harness Racing Hall of Fame (2012)

Rainbow Blue was the 2004 American Harness Horse of the Year as well as the Canadian Harness Horse of the Year.

Racing at age two she won six or her seven starts including a division of the Debutante Stakes and the Molly Pitcher Pace. The filly won 20 of the 21 races she entered in 2004. Her only loss came when she went off stride in the Mistletoe Shalee. Her victory highlights included the $543,543 Fan Hanover Stakes final, the $222,500 Nadia Lobell Pace final, the Matron Stakes and the $610,000 Breeders Crown 3YO Filly Pace final. The bay filly is the daughter of Artiscape and Vesta Blue Chip. She retired with a lifetime mark of 1:49 2/5. Rainbow Blue was inducted into the United States Harness Racing Hall of Fame in 2012.
