= John Chapman (harness racing) =

Personal information
- Born: November 25, 1928 Toronto, Ontario, Canada
- Died: May 2, 1980 (aged 51) Westbury, New York, USA
- Occupations: Harness racing driver & trainer

Horse racing career
- Sport: Horse racing
- Career wins: 3,914

Major racing wins
- Canadian Pacing Derby (1948); Lawrence B. Sheppard Pace (1972); International Trot (1973, 1974); Maple Leaf Trot (1975); Adios Pace (1977); Confederation Cup Pace (1977); Prix d'Été (1977) U.S. Pacing Triple Crown wins: Little Brown Jug (1977); Messenger Stakes (1977)

Honours
- Canadian Horse Racing Hall of Fame (1979); United States Harness Racing Hall of Fame (1980)

Significant horses
- Governor Skipper, Delmonica Hanover
- Updated on October 9, 2016

John Chapman (November 25, 1928 - May 2, 1980) was one of the most successful trainers and drivers in the sport of harness racing. He died unexpectedly at age 51 shortly after his ongoing career had been recognized with induction into his sport's Halls of Fame in both Canada and the United States. He grew up playing ice hockey and had captained the Toronto St. Michael's Majors team of the Ontario Junior Hockey League.
