= Charles Juravinski Memorial Cup =

Horse race in Ontario, Canada

- Class: Grade 2
- Location: Hamilton, Ontario, Canada
- Inaugurated: 1977
- Race type: Harness race for Standardbred pacers

Race information
- Distance: 1 mile (1,609 metres or 8 furlongs)
- Surface: Dirt, ½ mile oval
- Track: Flamboro Downs
- Qualification: 4-year-olds
- Purse: $247,500 (2024)

The Charles Juravinski Memorial Cup is a Grade 2 harness race for Standardbred pacers run annually at Flamboro Downs in Hamilton, Ontario, Canada. Set at a distance of one mile, it was first run in 1977 as the Confederation Cup Pace and through 2012 it was a race for three-year-olds. Placed on hiatus for 2013 and 2014, upon reinstatement in 2015, the Confederation Cup Pace was changed to an event for four-year-olds. The race was not contested in 2020 or 2021 due to the COVID-19 pandemic. In 2022, it was renamed the Charles Juravinski Memorial Cup in honour of Flamboro Downs' co-founder, Charles Juravinski, who died that year.

The Charles Juravinski Memorial Cup is the signature race of Flamboro Downs. Over the years it has attracted some of the very best horses in North America including U. S. and Canadian Hall of Fame horses Abercrombie, Cam Fella, Jate Lobell, On The Road Again, and Somebeachsomewhere.

== Historical race events ==
In 1985 Armbro Dallas finished first in the final but was disqualified making runner-up What's Next the winner. As a result, the race time was not recorded as official. Apaches Fame's win in 1990 marked the first time an Ontario sired, bred, and owned horse won the Confederation Cup.

In 2022, Linedrive Hanover broke the stakes, track, and Canadian record with a time of 1:49.

== Records ==
Most wins by a driver

- 5 – Paul MacDonell (1995, 1997, 1998, 2004, 2008)

Most wins by a trainer

- 4 – William Wellwood (1991, 1996, 1997, 2002)

Stakes record

- 1:49 0/0 – Linedrive Hanover (2022)

== Winners of the Confederation Cup Pace ==
Year	Winner	Age	Driver	Trainer	Owner	Time	Purse
2025	Calicojack Hanover	4	Louis-Philippe Roy	Luc Blais	Determination	1:50 2/5	$247,500
2024	Huntinthelastdolar	4	Yannick Gingras	Per Engblom	E Five Racing, John Fielding	1:50 0/0	$263,000
2023	Fourever Boy	4	Trevor Henry	Tim Twaddle	Mickie Rae Stables LLC, Tim Twaddle	1:51 3/5	$262,000
2022	Linedrive Hanover	4	James MacDonald	Anthony Beaton	West Wins Stable, McKinlay & Fielding, Mac Nichol	1:49 0/0	$273,500
2021	No Race	-	No Race	No Race	No Race	0:00 0/0	$000,000
2020	No Race	-	No Race	No Race	No Race	0:00 0/0	$000,000
2019	Done Well	4	Dexter Dunn	Ron Burke	Burke Racing Stable LLC, Weaver Bruscemi LLC, J&T Silva Stables, Purnel & Libby, Wingfield Brothers LLC	1:50 2/5	$188,500
2018	Filibuster Hanover	4	Yannick Gingras	Ron Burke	Burke Racing Stable LLC, Joseph Di Scala Jr., J&T Silva Stables, Weaver Bruscemi LLC	1:51 4/5	$182,500
2017	Western Fame	4	Trevor Henry	Jimmy Takter	Brittany Farms	1:50 2/5	$176,000
2016	Rockin Ron	4	Yannick Gingras	Ron Burke	Burke Racing Stable LLC	1:50 1/5	$244,000
2015	All Bets Off	4	Matt Kakaley	Ron Burke	Burke Racing Stable LLC	1:51 3/5	$226,575
2014	No Race	-	No Race	No Race	No Race	0:00 0/0	$000,000
2013	No Race	-	No Race	No Race	No Race	0:00 0/0	$000,000
2012	Michaels Power	3	Scott Zeron	Casie Coleman	Jeffrey S. Snyder	1:52 4/5	$581,500
2011	Bestofbest Hanover	3	Jack Moiseyev	Daniel Martin	L'Ecurie Triple P Inc. (Jean-Roch Perron)	1:52 0/0	$532,000
2010	Aracache Hanover	3	Doug McNair	Gregg McNair	William Switala & James Martin	1:52 1/5	$547,000
2009	If I Can Dream	3	Jim Morrill, Jr.	Tracy Brainard	Bulletproof Enterprises	1:52 1/5	$560,000
2008	Somebeachsomewhere	3	Paul MacDonell	Brent MacGrath	Somebeachsomewhere Syndicate	1:49 2/5	$493,000
2007	Laughing Art	3	Jody Jamieson	Bill Elliott	Antonio Chiravalle	1:53 3/5	$548,500
2006	Armbro Deuce	3	George Brennan	Blair Burgess	R. Burgess, K. Olsson Burgess, N. Cooper, R. Kostoff	1:50 2/5	$508,000
2005	American Ideal	3	Mark J. MacDonald	Casie Coleman	Mac Nichol	1:50 3/5	$441,980
2004	Sparkler	3	Paul MacDonell	Mark Harder	Patrick Ryan	1:53 1/5	$567,000
2003	Stonebridge Premio	3	Michel Lachance	Brett Pelling	Robert Waxman	1:54 3/5	$472,120
2002	Art Major	3	Steve Condren	William Robinson	Deena Frost, Thomas & Louis Pontone, Lou & Debora Domiano	1:51 1/5	$519,000
2001	Ring of Life	3	Sylvain Filion	Yves Filion	Yves Filion	1:54 2/5	$531,500
2000	High On Emotion	3	Ronald Pierce	Brett Pelling	Millar Farms (George Millar, Sr.)	1:54 1/5	$187,800
1999	Teeth Of The Dog	3	John Stark, Jr.	John Stark, Jr.	Ted Cupp	1:55 0/0	$168,400
1998	Rustler Hanover	3	Paul MacDonell	William Wellwood	Wellwood Stables, A F J Stable	1:53 1/5	$183,600
1997	Village Jasper	3	Paul MacDonell	William Wellwood	William Wellwood	1:55 3/5	$180,500
1996	Stout	3	Tony Kerwood	William Robinson	Matt, Pat, & Dan Daly	1:54 0/0	$175,000
1995	Village Connection	3	Paul MacDonell	William Wellwood	Wellwood Stables	1:54 0/0	$160,000
1994	Hi Ho Silverheels	3	William Fahy	Milan Smith	Myrna Smith & Roy Moorefield	1:54 4/5	$149,000
1993	Broadway Blue	3	Don Irvine, Jr.	Robert Murray	Robert E. Cseplo	1:54 3/5	$171,500
1992	Survivor Gold	3	Doug Brown	William Robinson	Lobro Stables, J. & L. Aarts & Robert H. Grand Holdings	1:54 3/5	$141,600
1991	Arcane Hanover	3	Norm McKnight, Jr.	William Robinson	Lothlorien Equestrian Centre	1:53 3/5	$363,500
1990	Apaches Fame	3	William (Bud) Fritz	William (Bud) Fritz	Dovers Venture II	1:55 0/0	$341,000
1989	Mystery Fund	3	William Gale	Robert McIntosh	George Segal	1:56 3/5	$311,500
1988	Matt's Scooter	3	Michel Lachance	Harry J. Poulton	Gordon & Illa Rumpel, Charles Juravinski	1:55 0/0	$318,500
1987	Jate Lobell	3	Mark O'Mara	Mark O'Mara	Joe McCluskey & Kentuckiana Farms	1:54 1/5	$378,500
1986	Nobleland Sam	3	Sam Noble III	Sam Noble III	Sam Noble	1:55 1/5	$230,000
1985	What's Next	3	John Plutino	Joseph Caraluzzi	Caraluzzi-McNichol Stable, Inc.	0:00 0/0 †	$250,000
1984	On The Road Again	3	William "Buddy" Gilmour	Harry J. Poulton	Gordon & Illa Rumpel	1:56 1/5	$202,500
1983	Time To Cash	3	Myles (Mickey) McNichol	Ray Flis	Mike Caggiano, Guy Cutuh, George Patten	1:57 3/5	$210,000
1982	Cam Fella	3	Pat Crowe	Pat Crowe	Norman Clements & Norman Faulkner	1:58 1/5	$125,000
1981	Conquered	3	Dr. John Hayes	Dr. John Hayes	Beejay Stables & C. Juravinski	1:58 0/0	$100,000
1980	Justin Passing	3	Doug Arthur	Doug Arthur	L. J. Applegath, Kingfish Stable	1:58 0/0	$100,000
1979	Hot Hitter	3	Henri Filion	Louis Meittinis	Solomon Katz, S A J & Alterman Stables	1:57 3/5	$110,500
1978	Abercrombie	3	Glen Garnsey	Glen Garnsey	L. Keith Bulen & Shirley A. Mitchell	1:56 4/5	$93,000
1977	Governor Skipper	3	John Chapman	H. "Bucky" Norris	Ivanhoe Stables, Inc.	1:57 3/5	$72,500

- † No official time recorded due to disqualification of 1st-place finisher, Armbro Dallas.
