= Metro Pace =

- Class: Grade 1
- Location: Campbellville, Ontario
- Inaugurated: 1988
- Race type: Harness race for standardbred pacers
- Website: Official Site

Race information
- Distance: 1 mile (1,609 metres or 8 furlongs)
- Surface: Dirt, 7/8 mile oval
- Track: Mohawk Racetrack
- Qualification: 2 year olds
- Purse: $1,000,000 (2025)

The Metro Pace is a Grade 1 harness race for two-year-old Standardbred pacers. First run in 1988 at Woodbine Racetrack in Toronto, Ontario, in several of the ensuing years it was hosted by Mohawk Raceway in Campbellville, Ontario where it has been run exclusively since 2005.

== Historical race events ==
The 1990 Metro Pace winner, Artsplace, was the first horse to ever win and sire a Metro Pace winner, his sons doing it twice in 1998 (Grinfromeartoear) and again in 1999 (The Firepan).

Son of 2007 Metro Pace winner Somebeachsomewhere, Captaintreacherous captured the 2012 edition.

In 2024, Tony Alagna and Tim Tetrick became the first trainer/driver duo to win the race twice. They won with Fallout, a son of Captaintreacherous, whom they won with in 2012.

== Records ==
Most wins by a driver

- 4 – John Campbell (1990, 1996, 1999, 2000), Jody Jamieson (2006, 2010, 2022, 2023)

Most wins by a trainer

- 4 – Tony Alagna (2012, 2014, 2020, 2024)

Stakes record

- 1:49 1/5 – Tall Dark Stranger (2019), Fallout (2024), Beau Jangles (2025)

== Winners of the Metro Pace ==
Year	Winner	Driver	Trainer	Owner	Time	Purse	Track
2025	Beau Jangles	Bob McClure	Dr. Ian Moore	Graham Grace Stables, Kiwi Stables, Bolton Stables	1:49 1/5	$1,000,000	Moh
2024	Fallout	Tim Tetrick	Tony Alagna	Robert Leblanc, Pryde Stables, Caviart Farms	1:49 1/5	$1,000,000	Moh
2023	Captains Quarters	Jody Jamieson	Herb Holland	Rich Stiles	1:49 3/5	$970,000	Moh
2022	Stockade Seelster	Jody Jamieson	Dr. Ian Moore	Paul and Sally MacDonald	1:50 1/5	$900,000	Moh
2021	Monte Miki	Scott Zeron	Mark Evers	Velocity Standardbreds	1:52 2/5	$824,000	Moh
2020	Exploit	Doug McNair	Tony Alagna	LeBlanc and Kribbs, Joe Sbrocco, In The GYM Partners, Joe Barbera	1:50 4/5	$720,000	Moh
2019	Tall Dark Stranger	Yannick Gingras	Nancy Johansson	Crawford Farms Racing, Marvin Katz, Caviart Farms, Howard Taylor	1:49 1/5	$750,000	Moh
2018	Stag Party	David Miller	Casie Coleman	John Fielding, Mac Nichol, McKinlay & Fielding, West Wins Stable.	1:50 4/5	$890,000	Moh
2017	Lost In Time	Scott Zeron	James Mulinix	James Mulinix, Denny Miller, William Rufenacht	1:50 1/5	$816,000	Moh
2016	Beyond Delight	Sylvain Filion	Tony O'Sullivan	Jeffrey & Michael Snyder, Four Friends Racing Stable	1:51 3/5	$661,000	Moh
2015	Control The Moment	Randy Waples	Brad Maxwell	Brad Maxwell, Howard Taylor, Edwin Gold & Ben Mudry	1:49 4/5	$685,000	Moh
2014	Artspeak	Scott Zeron	Tony Alagna	Brittany Farms, Marvin Katz, Joe Sbrocco, In The Gym Partners	1:50 2/5	$667,000	Moh
2013	Boomboom Ballykeel	Sylvain Filion	Richard Moreau	Ballykeel Racing Inc.	1:50 4/5	$683,000	Moh
2012	Captaintreacherous	Tim Tetrick	Tony Alagna	Brittany Farms, Marvin Katz, Joe Sbrocco, White Birch Farm	1:49 2/5	$1,000,000	Moh
2011	Simply Business	Ronald Pierce	Jimmy Takter	Brixton Medical Ab, Order BY Stable, et al.	1:50 1/5	$1,000,000	Moh
2010	Mystician	Jody Jamieson	Jeff Gillis	Jeff Gillis, Ken Henwood	1:53 4/5	$1,000,000	Moh
2009	Sportswriter	Mark J. MacDonald	Casie Coleman	Steve Calhoun, West Wins Stable	1:49 2/5	$1,000,000	Moh
2008	Major In Art	Brian Sears	Justin Lebo	Major In Art Syndicate	1:51 2/5	$1,000,000	Moh
2007	Somebeachsomewhere	Paul MacDonell	Jean-Louis Arseanault	Schooner Stables	1:49 3/5	$1,000,000	Moh
2006	Yankee Skyscaper [sic]	Jody Jamieson	Christopher Ryder	Yankee Skyscaper Partners	1:53 4/5	$1,000,000	Moh
2005	Jeremes Jet	Paul MacDonell	Tom Harmer	Genesis Racing Stable	1:50 4/5	$1,000,000	Moh
2004	Rocknroll Hanover	Brian Sears	Brett Pelling	Jeffrey S. Snyder, Lothlorien Equestrian Centre	1:49 4/5	$1,211,800	Wdb
2003	Camelot Hall	George Brennan	Darren McCall	David Scharf, Steven Arnold, Jerry Silva, et al.	1:51 4/5	$1,122,700	Wdb
2002	Sir Luck	Mike Saftic	William Budd	C. and I. Racing Satble	1:51 3/5	$1,100,000	Wdb
2001	Mach Three	Michel Lachance	Shawn Robinson	Linda Magid	1:51 4/5	$1,123,400	Wdb
2000	Pro Bono Best	John Campbell	Des Tackoor	Levy Racing (John Levy), Mark Scholes, Des Tackoor	1:51 0/0	$661,800	Wdb
1999	The Firepan	John Campbell	Nat Varty	Peter Pan Stables, Inc. (Robert Glazer)	1:51 2/5	$600,000	Wdb
1998	Grinfromeartoear	Luc Ouellette	Duane Marfisi	Perfect World Enterprises	1:52 3/5	$600,100	Wdb
1997	Rustler Hanover	Paul MacDonell	William Wellwood	Wellwood & AFJ Stables	1:52 3/5	$601,400	Wdb
1996	Gothic Dream	John Campbell	Jack Darling	Danniel W. Smith, Darling Stables (Jack Darling)	1:51 3/5	$603,100	Moh
1995	A Stud Named Sue	George Brennan	Liz Quesnel	Liz Quesnel, R. & C. Beltrame	1:53 3/5	$505,100	Wdb
1994	Rover Hanover	Joe Hudon	Joe Hudon	Wayne Giles, Dr. Herbert Boggs, Joe Hudon	1:54 3/5	$531,600	Wdb
1993	Historic	Doug Brown	Stewart Firlotte	Robert H. Grand Holdings	1:53 1/5	$534,200	Moh
1992	Presidential Ball	Jack Moiseyev	William G. Robinson	Antonio Chiaravalle	1:54 3/5	$719,000	Wdb
1991	Shipps Saint	Tim Twaddle	John Burns	Harold G. Shipp Stable	1:54 3/5	$716,000	Moh
1990	Artsplace	John Campbell	Gene Riegle	George Segal, Brian Monieson	1:53 4/5	$797,400	Wdb
1989	Road Machine	Trevor Ritchie	Blair Burgess	Cantario Farms, D. Thompson	1:56 1/5	$581,000	Wdb
1988	Totally Ruthless	Bill O'Donnell	Steve Elliott	Totally Ruthless Stable	1:55 3/5	$491,000	Wdb
