= Bill O'Donnell (harness race driver) =

Canadian harness race driver

Personal information
- Born: May 4, 1948 (age 78) Springhill, Nova Scotia, Canada
- Occupations: Harness racing driver & trainer

Horse racing career
- Sport: Horse racing
- Career wins: 5,742

Major racing wins
- Driver wins: William R. Haughton Memorial Pace (1982, 1993); U.S. Pacing Championship (1982, 1993); Little Brown Jugette (1983); New Jersey Classic Pace (1983, 1985); Glen Garnsey Memorial Pace (1984, 1987); Hambletonian Oaks (1984); Woodrow Wilson Pace (1984); Meadowlands Pace (1985); Stanley Dancer Memorial Pace (1985, 1996) Roses Are Red Stakes (1986); Adios Pace (1988) Metro Pace (1988); Merrie Annabelle Pace (1989, 1995); Miss New Jersey Pace (1990); Milton Stakes (1991); Canadian Pacing Derby (1992, 1993); Breeders Crown wins: Breeders Crown 3YO Colt & Gelding Pace (1984, 1985, 1988); Breeders Crown 3YO Filly Pace (1988); Breeders Crown Open Mare Pace (1991); Breeders Crown Open Pace (1993); Breeders Crown 3YO Filly Trot (1994); Breeders Crown 3YO Colt & Gelding Trot (1995); Trotting Triple Crown wins: Hambletonian Stakes (1985); Yonkers Trot (1989); Kentucky Futurity (1983, 1984, 1987); Pacing Triple Crown wins: Messenger Stakes (1984, 1985, 1989); Little Brown Jug (1985, 1986); Cane Pace (1986)

Racing awards
- Harness Tracks of America Driver of the Year (1982, 1984); United States Champion Driver by Earnings (1984)

Honours
- Nova Scotia Sport Hall of Fame (1986); Canadian Horse Racing Hall of Fame (1986); United States Harness Racing Hall of Fame (1991); Canada's Sports Hall of Fame (1992); Little Brown Jug Wall of Fame (2003)

Significant horses
- Barberry Spur, Staying Together; Nihilator, Prakas
- Updated on January 10, 2017

William Arthur O'Donnell (born May 4, 1948 in Springhill, Nova Scotia) is a Canadian harness racing driver.

O'Donnell's parents, Etta and Henry, were both heavily involved in the local racing circuit. After graduating from high school, he became second trainer for Jim Doherty, and moved to Saratoga Springs, New York, where in 1979 he set the all-time record for most wins (269) at a single track in a single season. Later he went to the Meadowlands in New Jersey on the Grand Circuit.

O'Donnell was given the nickname the "Magic Man" for being able to drive a horse seemingly past its limitations. In 1982 and 1984 he was voted the Harness Tracks of America Driver of the Year award. In 1984 he also set a yearly earnings record of over $9 million. In a race in 1984 with Nihilator, O'Donnell was the first to post a sub-1:50 race mile in the $2,161,000 Woodrow Wilson Pace, the richest race ever contested to that point." It was the first time that William O'Donnell had ever driven the son of Niatross. Bill O'Donnell won the driving title, his third in four years. The next year, he became harness racing's first driver to eclipse $10 million in earnings in a single year.

O'Donnell has 5,742 lifetime victories as a driver with just under $100 million earned by the horses he has guided. A native of Springhill, Nova Scotia, he was the leading driver at the Meadowlands in New Jersey, for many years and established a number of records with respect to wins and earnings.

In 2001, O'Donnell moved back to Canada, settling in Acton, Ontario, to focus more on training horses. Since then, he has also become involved in the politics of racing, giving much of his time and considerable expertise to several horsemen's groups. He currently serves as President of the Central Ontario Standardbred Association, which has the racing contract with the largest track operator in Canada, Woodbine Entertainment Group. In addition, he serves as the representative for Standardbred horse people on the board of the Ontario Horse Racing Industry Association as well as a Vice-President of the Ontario Standardbred Adoption Society. He has four children, Faith, Christopher, Megan, and Sean.

Bill O'Donnell has been inducted into Canada's Sports Hall of Fame (1992), the Nova Scotia Sports Hall of Fame, the Canadian Horse Racing Hall of Fame (1986), and the United States Harness Racing Hall of Fame in Goshen, NY (1991).
