= Canadian Harness Horse of the Year =

Somebeachsomewhere Horse of the Year
- Sport: Harness racing
- Awarded for: Horse that made the greatest contribution to Canadian racing
- Country: Canada
- Presented by: Standardbred Canada

History
- First award: 1989
- First winner: Matt's Scooter
- Most recent: Beau Jangles

Canadian Harness Horse of the Year is an annual award in the sport of harness racing in Canada. It is the most prestigious Canadian award among those given to a Standardbred horse. Part of the O'Brien Award program, named in honour of legendary Canadian driver / trainer Joe O'Brien since 1989, the Horse of the Year award honours the top performing pacer or trotter in Canadian racing. In 2018, Standardbred Canada renamed the award to the Somebeachsomewhere Horse of the Year to honour the late champion, who died earlier that year. Operated by Standardbred Canada, its website states that "every media person across Canada who covers harness racing on a regular basis receives a ballot, this includes writers for the various trade publications as well as those in print, radio and television. All Canadian race secretaries and track publicists also participate in the voting," and that "The voters' list is vigorously scrutinized each year with names added and deleted when necessary."

== Historical notes ==
Through 2024, Somebeachsomewhere is the only horse win the award twice.

Both Western Dreamer in 1997 and Blissfull Hall in 1999 won the U.S. Pacing Triple Crown.

In 1996 and again in 2007 there was a tie.

== Past winners ==
^	Also named United States Harness Horse of the Year
†	Member of the Canadian Horse Racing Hall of Fame
*	Member of the United States Harness Racing Hall of Fame

Year	Winner	Gait	Age	Trainer	Owner	Breeder
2025	Beau Jangles^	P	2	Dr. Ian Moore	Graham Grace Stables LLC, Kiwi Stables LLC, Bolton Stables	Tara Hills Stud
2024	Chantilly	P	2	Nick Gallucci	Millar Farms	Millar Farms
2023	Sylvia Hanover	P	3	Shawn Steacy, Mark Steacy	Hudson Standardbred Stable	Hanover Shoe Farms
2022	Bulldog Hanover ^†	P	4	Jack Darling	Jack Darling Stables, Brad Grant	Hanover Shoe Farms
2021	Desperate Man	P	3	Kathy Cecchin	Kathy Cecchin, Paul Cecchin, Nicole Davies, Paul Davies	Winbak Farm
2020	Century Farroh	P	4	Dr. Ian Moore	Ratchford Stable NS	Century Spring Farms
2019	Forbidden Trade	T	3	Luc Blais	Determination	Steve H. Stewart
2018	McWicked ^†*	P	7	Casie Coleman	SSG Stables	Andray Farm
2017	Hannelore Hanover ^*	T	5	Ron Burke	Burke Racing Stable, Weaver Bruscemi, Frank Baldachino, J&T Silva Stables	Hanover Shoe Farms
2016	Betting Line	P	3	Casie Coleman	Ross Warriner, Steve Calhoun, Christine Calhoun, Mac Nichol, Casie Coleman	Fair Winds Farm, Inc.
2015	State Treasurer	P	6	Dr. Ian Moore	Sally & Paul MacDonald	Brittany Farms
2014	JK Shesalady ^	P	2	Nancy Johansson	3 Brothers Stables (Alan, Ronald, & Steven Katz)	3 Brothers Stables (Alan, Ronald, & Steven Katz)
2013	Bee A Magician ^*	T	4	Richard Norman	Mel Hartman, Herb Liverman, Dave McDuffee	White Birch Farm
2012	Michaels Power	P	3	Casie Coleman	Jeffrey S. Snyder	Jeffrey S. Snyder
2011	San Pail ^†	T	7	Rod Hughes	Glenn Van Camp & Rod Hughes	Glenn Van Camp
2010	Dreamfair Eternal †	P	6	Pat Fletcher	John Lamers	John P. Lamers & Mary G. Lamers
2009	Muscle Hill ^*	T	3	Gregory B. Peck	TLP Stable, Jerry Silva, Southwind Farm, Muscle Hill Racing	Winbak Farm
2008	Somebeachsomewhere ^†* (2)	P	3	Brent MacGrath	Schooner Stables (B. MacGrath, B. & R. Petitpas, G. Pye, S. Rath, J.Bagnall, P. Dean)	Stephanie Smithrothaug
2007	Somebeachsomewhere †*	P	2	Brent MacGrath	Schooner Stables (B. MacGrath, B. & R. Petitpas, G. Pye, S. Rath, J.Bagnall, P. Dean)	Stephanie Smithrothaug
2007	Tell All	P	3	Blair Burgess	My Desire Stable	Tom Crouch
2006	Majestic Son †	T	3	Mark Steacy	Majestic Son Stable	Peter Dennis & Mike Schertzer
2005	Admiral's Express †	P	9	Mike Hales	Gary & Laurel Gust, Cheryl & Edward D. Sayfie	Pebble Creek Farm, Inc.
2004	Rainbow Blue ^*	P	3	George Teague, Jr.	K&R Racing, LLC (Kevin & Ron Fry) & Teague, Inc.	Winbak Farm
2003	Eternal Camnation †	P	6	Jeffrey Miller	Eternal Camnation Stable (Doc & Dorothy Miller)	Frederick W.Hertrich II
2002	Real Desire ^†*	P	4	Blair Burgess	Brittany Farms, R. Burgess, K. Olsson Burgess, Perretti Farms	Fair Island Farm
2001	Bettor's Delight †	P	3	Scott McEneny	John B. Grant	Winbak Farm
2000	Yankee Paco	T	3	Douglas McIntosh	Harry Ivey & Dr. Tom Ivey	Yankeeland Farms, Inc.
1999	Blissfull Hall †	P	3	Benjamin Wallace	Daniel Plouffe	Walnut Hall Limited
1998	Odies Fame †	P	2	Harold Wellwood	Harold Wellwood & Dr. Norman Amoss	Glengate Farms
1997	Western Dreamer	P	3	William G. Robinson	Matthew, Patrick Jr., & Daniel Daly	Kentuckiana Farms
1996	Whenuwishuponastar	P	2	Robert McIntosh	R. McIntosh Stable, Seymour Grundy, Leo Beaudoin, David Kryway	New Destiny Stable
1996	Riyadh	P	6	William G. Robinson	R. Peter Heffering	Kentuckiana Farms
1995	Ellamony †	P	5	Stephan Doyle	Charles A. Juravinski	Charles A. Juravinski
1994	Emilie Cas El	T	2	R. Dustin Jones	R. Dustin Jones & Wendell Cass	Angus Farm (Pierre Levesque)
1993	Staying Together ^†	P	4	Robert McIntosh	Robert Hamather	Kentuckiana Farms
1992	Artsplace ^†*	P	4	Gene Riegle	George Segal & Brian Monieson	George Segal
1991	Precious Bunny ^†*	P	3	William G. Robinson	R. Peter Heffering	Alfred Ochsner, Jr.,
1990	Town Pro †	P	3	Stewart Firlotte	Pro Group Stable	J. Brian Webster & Ray Bednarz
1989	Matt's Scooter ^†*	P	4	Harry J. Poulton	Gordon & Illa Rumpel, Charles A. Juravinski	Max Gerson

- † - tie
