= Ben Franklin Free-For-All Pace =

Annual harness race in Pennsylvania

- Location: Wilkes-Barre, Pennsylvania, USA
- Inaugurated: 2007
- Race type: Harness race for Standardbred pacers
- Website: Mohegan Sun Pocono racing

Race information
- Distance: 1 mile (1609 metres or 8 furlongs)
- Surface: Dirt, 5/8 mile oval
- Track: Pocono Downs
- Qualification: 4yo & up
- Purse: $500,000 (2016)

The Ben Franklin Free-For-All Pace is harness racing stakes race for older Standardbred pacers run annually since 2007 at Pocono Downs in Wilkes-Barre, Pennsylvania.

== Historical race events ==
Boulder Creek set a new track record time of 1:48 3/5 in winning the 2007 inaugural race.

Sweet Lou, the 2011 winner of the Dan Patch Award for Two-Year-Old Male Pacer, won the 2013 Ben Franklin FFA Pace in which he set a new track and World Record for a 5/8 mile track with a time of 1:47 flat.

In 2016, Always B Miki equaled Sweet Lou's World Record time in winning the June 25, 2016 Ben Franklin FFA Pace elimination race. He came back to win the July 2 final in exactly the same World Record time.

== Records ==
Most wins by a driver

- 3 – Tim Tetrick (2007, 2008, 2010)

Most wins by a trainer

- 2 – Jimmy Takter (2010, 2016) & Ron Burke (2013, 2014)

Stakes record

- 1:47 0/0 – Sweet Lou (2014) - new World Record
- 1:47 0/0 – Always B Miki (2016) - equaled World Record

== Ben Franklin Free-For-All Pace winners ==
| Year | Winner | Age | Driver | Trainer | Owner | Time | Purse |
|---|---|---|---|---|---|---|---|
| 2016 | Always B Miki | 5 | David Miller | Jimmy Takter | Bluewood Stable, Roll The Dice Stable, Christina E. Takter | 1:47 0/0 | $500,000 |
| 2015 | Luck Be Withyou | 4 | George Napolitano, Jr. | Chris Oakes | John Craig | 1:49 0/0 | $500,000 |
| 2014 | Sweet Lou | 5 | Ron Pierce | Ron Burke | Burke Racing Stable, Weaver Bruscemi LLC, Lawrence Karr, Phillip Collura | 1:47 0/0 | $500,000 |
| 2013 | Foiled Again | 9 | Yannick Gingras | Ron Burke | Burke Racing Stable, Weaver Bruscemi LLC, Lawrence Karr, Phillip Collura | 1:49 2/5 | $500,000 |
| 2012 | Betterthancheddar | 4 | George Brennan | Casie Coleman | Steve Calhoun & West Wins Stable | 1:48 0/0 | $500,000 |
| 2011 | We Will See | 4 | Ron Pierce | Sam DePinto | Shannon DePinto, Earl Smith, Jerry Silva | 1:48 4/5 | $500,000 |
| 2010 | Vintage Master | 4 | Tim Tetrick | Jimmy Takter | Brittany Farms & Brian Monieson Trust | 1:49 0/0 | $500,000 |
| 2009 | Mister Big | 6 | Brian Sears | Virgil Morgan, Jr. | Joseph Muscara, Sr. | 1:48 0/0 | $500,000 |
| 2008 | Artistic Fella | 5 | Tim Tetrick | Steve Elliott | Joseph Alborano | 1:48 0/0 | $500,000 |
| 2007 | Boulder Creek | 7 | Tim Tetrick | Mark Silva | Clifford Siegel, Lee Wasserman, John Fodera | 1:48 3/5 | $300,000 |
