= Canadian Pacing Derby =

Horse race in Ontario, Canada

- Class: Grade 1
- Location: Campbellville, Ontario, Canada
- Inaugurated: 1936
- Race type: Free For All Harness race for standardbred pacers
- Website: Woodbine Entertainment Group

Race information
- Distance: 1 mile (1,609 metres or 8 furlongs)
- Surface: Dirt, 7/8 mile oval
- Track: Woodbine Mohawk Park
- Qualification: 3-years-old & up
- Purse: $690,000 (2025)

The Canadian Pacing Derby is a Grade 1 race for three-year-old and older Standardbred pacers run at a distance of one mile at Woodbine Mohawk Park in Campbellville, Ontario.

== Historical race events ==
The Canadian Pacing Derby was first run on August 12, 1936, at Fountain Park Racetrack in New Hamburg, Ontario, operated by the New Hamburg Turf Club. For 1949 only, the race was renamed the Canadian Pacing And Trotting Derby with trotting horses allowed to compete against pacers. The lone trotter entered finished far back. The Derby was suspended after the 1957 running and was not revived until 1965 when it was raced as a 1-3/16 mile event at Greenwood Raceway in Toronto. The following year the race returned to the standard distance of a mile.

== Race locations ==
- Fountain Park: 1936–1957
- Greenwood Raceway: 1965–1993
- Woodbine Racetrack: 1994–2004
- Woodbine Mohawk Park: since 2005

== Records ==
Most wins by a horse

- 4 – The Count B (1944, 1945, 1947, 1948)

Most wins by an owner

- 5 – James W. Brown (1941, 1944, 1945, 1947, 1948)

Most wins by a driver

- 4 – John Campbell (1996, 1998, 2002, 2003)

Most wins by a trainer

- 6 – William Robinson (1978, 1986, 1994, 1995, 1999, 2003)

Most wins by an owner

- 5 – James W. Brown (1941, 1944, 1945, 1947, 1948)

=== Stakes records ===
At Fountain Park

- 2:04 1/5 – Blue Again (1946)

At Greenwood

- 1:51 1/5 – Staying Together (1993)

At Woodbine

- 1:48 3/5 – Casimir Camotion (2004)

At Mohawk

- 1:46 4/5 – Bulldog Hanover (2022)

== Canadian Pacing Derby winners ==
Year	Winner	Age	Driver	Trainer	Owner	Time	Purse
2025	Maximus Miki	6	Scott Zeron	Tom Cancelliere	John Cancelliere	1:48 1/5	$690,000
2024	It's My Show	4	Scott Zeron	Linda Toscano	Richard Young, Joanne Young	1:48 1/5	$540,000
2023	Tattoo Artist	6	Louis-Philippe Roy	Ian Moore	Let It Ride Stables, Frank Cannon, Diamond Creek Racing, Bottom Line Racing	1:47 4/5	$615,000
2022	Bulldog Hanover	4	Dexter Dunn	Jack Darling	Jack Darling, Brad Grant	1:46 4/5	$650,000
2021	Allywag Hanover	4	Todd McCarthy	Brett Pelling	Allywag Stable	1:49 0/0	$590,000
2020	Dorsoduro Hanover	5	James MacDonald	Ron Burke	Burke Racing Stable LLC, J&T Silva Purnel & Libb, Weaver Bruscemi LLC, Wingfield Brothers LLC	1:48 4/5	$540,000
2019	Courtly Choice	4	James MacDonald	Blake Macintosh	Hutt Racing Stable, Mac And Heim Stables, Daniel Plouffe, Touchstone Farms Inc.	1:48 4/5	$525,000
2018	McWicked	7	David Miller	Casie Coleman	SSG Stables	1:49 0/0	$600,000
2017	Sintra	4	Jody Jamieson	Gaetan Hebert	Brad Gray, Michael Guerriero, Menary Racing Inc.	1:48 1/5	$615,000
2016	Wiggle It Jiggleit	4	Montrell Teague	Clyde Francis	George Teague, Jr.	1:49 0/0	$616,000
2015	State Treasurer	6	Randy Waples	Ian Moore	Paul MacDonald & Sally MacDonald	1:47 4/5	$685,000
2014	Modern Legend	6	David Miller	David Drew	Dave Drew Associates Inc.	1:47 2/5	$634,000
2013	A Rocknroll Dance	4	Tim Tetrick	Jim Mulinix	A Rocknroll Dance Stable	1:47 2/5	$651,000
2012	Foiled Again	8	Yannick Gingras	Ron Burke	Burke Racing Stable LLC, Weaver Bruscemi LLC, Jjk Stables LLC	1:48 3/5	$787,000
2011	We Will See	4	Ron Pierce	Cosmo De Pinto	Shannon De Pinto, Earl Smith, Millstone, Jerry Silva	1:47 4/5	$832,000
2010	Won The West	6	David Miller	Ron Burke	Strollin Stable, William Robinson, James Koehler	1:51 2/5	$780,000
2009	Shark Gesture	6	George Brennan	Larry Remmen	Norman Smiley, Gerald Smiley	1:48 1/5	$685,000
2008	Mister Big	5	Brian Sears	Virgil Morgan, Jr.	Joseph V. Muscara	1:50 0/0	$702,000
2007	Lis Mara	5	Brian Sears	Ervin Miller	Lis Mara Syndicate	1:49 3/5	$737,000
2006	Lis Mara	4	Brian Sears	Ervin Miller	MJG Racing Stables Inc., Louis Willinger	1:48 4/5	$933,000
2005	Ponder	4	Jack Moiseyev	Robert McIntosh	Robert McIntosh Stables Inc., CSX Stables Inc., John Fielding	1:49 2/5	$831,000
2004	Casimir Camotion	4	Patrick D. Lachance	Patrick D. Lachance	M And M Harness Racing	1:48 3/5	$920,000
2003	Art Major	4	John Campbell	William Robinson	(Lessee) Blue Chip Bloodstock Inc., James Simpson, Art Major Stable	1:49 1/5	$824,000
2002	Real Desire	4	John Campbell	Blair Burgess	Brittany Farms, R. Burgess, K. Olsson Burgess, Perretti Farms	1:49 4/5	$845,500
2001	Gallo Blue Chip	4	Daniel Dubé	Mark Ford	Martin Scharf	1:49 2/5	$850,000
2000	Western Ideal	4	Michel Lachance	Brett Pelling	Brittany Farms	1:49 0/0	$600,000
1999	Dragon Again	4	Brett Robinson	William Robinson	Ed Mullinax	1:49 1/5	$350,000
1998	Noble Ability	4	John Campbell	Joe Stutzman	Peter Pan Stables	1:50 1/5	$362,750
1997	Strong Clan	5	Randy Waples	Stewart Firlotte	Elgin Strong, Peter McArthur	1:51 1/5	$258,750
1996	Ball And Chain	6	John Campbell	Joe Stutzman	Joe Stutzman, George Millar, Sr., Fielding Equine	1:50 2/5	$267,750
1995	Pacific Rocket	4	Jack Moiseyev	William Robinson	R. Peter Heffering, Ed Lohmeyer, John Stoddard, John Vankirk	1:50 1/5	$278,250
1994	Ready To Rumble	4	Trevor Ritchie	William Robinson	Lothlorien Equestrian Center	1:51 2/5	$208,750
1993	Staying Together	4	Bill O'Donnell	Robert McIntosh	Robert Hamather	1:51 1/5	$205,000
1992	Artsplace	4	Bill O'Donnell	Robert McIntosh	George Segal, Brian Monieson	1:51 3/5	$222,750
1991	Odds Against	4	Dave Wall	Robert McIntosh	George Segal	1:51 4/5	$230,750
1990	Topnotcher	4	Doug Brown	Rene Laarman	Alexander Horn, Alan Berk	1:52 2/5	$262,250
1989	Camtastic	4	Tom Harmer	Robert Bencal	Camtastic Stable Inc.	1:52 4/5	$237,500
1988	Indian Alert	4	Myles "Mickey" McNichol	Jim Campbell	Gaylord & Scarlett Hilander	1:54 0/0	$226,750
1987	Indian Alert	3	Myles "Mickey" McNichol	Greg Wright	Gaylord Hilander	1:56 2/5	$113,940
1986	Witsends Gypsy	4	Larry Walker	William Robinson	Antonio Chiaravalle	1:53 3/5	$108,300
1985	On The Road Again	4	William "Buddy" Gilmour	Harry J. Poulton	Illa & Gordon Rumpel, The Road Group, Blue Chip Partners	1:55 3/5	$124,000
1984	Mr Dalrae	5	Dave Magee	Jim Dennis	A La Carte Racing Stable	1:54 0/0	$138,000
1983	Cam Fella	4	Pat Crowe	Pat Crowe	Norman Clements & Norman Faulkner, JEF's Stable	1:54 4/5	$125,500
1982	Willow Wiper	4	Ray McLean	J. Morrissey	Robert Hamather	1:55 3/5	$134,500
1981	Royce	4	Walter Paisley	James Crane	A. & C. Skolnick, J. & P. Crane	1:56 1/5	$102,500
1980	Direct Scooter	4	Warren Cameron	Warren Cameron	Valiant Racing Stable, G. Oriove, M. J. Fischer, R. C. Fogal	1:57 3/5	$100,000
1979	Try Scotch	5	Shelly Goudreau	Shelly Goudreau	T. Crouch, S. Newcom, C. Mahistedt	1:57 2/5	$100,000
1978	Dream Maker	5	Ron Waples	William Robinson	Antonio Chiaravalle	1:56 1/5	$89,500
1977	Rambling Willie	7	Robert Farrington	Robert Farrington	Farrington Stable Inc.	1:57 1/5	$86,500
1976	Rambling Willie	6	Robert Farrington	Robert Farrington	Farrington Stable Inc.	1:57 4/5	$61,600
1975	Rambling Willie (DH)	5	Robert Farrington	Robert Farrington	Farrington Stable Inc.	1:58 4/5	$46,150
1975	Pickwick Baron (DH)	4	Mel Turcotte	Leo Sohnlen	Leo Sohnlen	1:58 4/5	$46,150
1974	Otaro Hanover	4	Hervé Filion	Hervé Filion	L Bar & Capital Hill Farms	1:58 2/5	$59,700
1973	Sir Dalrae	4	Jim Dennis	Jim Dennis	A La Carte Racing Stable	1:57 3/5	$58,300
1972	Albatross	4	Stanley Dancer	Stanley Dancer	Amicable Stable	1:58 2/5	$59,400
1971	Kentucky	4	Bruce Nickells	Bruce Nickells	Quaker City Stables	1:59 3/5	$55,400
1970	Horton Hanover	5	Joe O'Brien	Joe O'Brien	Armstrong Bros.	1:59 3/5	$49,000
1969	Overcall	6	Del Insko	Del Insko	Helen R. Buck	2:00 2/5	$41,800
1968	Timely Knight	7	Roger White	Roger White	Allen Leblanc	2:01 1/5	$31,500
1967	Good Time Boy	4	Jacques Larente	Frank Safford	Gray Bros.	1:59 4/5	$18,900
1966	H A Meadowland	3	Ron Feagan	Ron Feagan	Ron & George Feagan	2:00 1/5	$14,760
1965	Jerry Hal	3	Wally McIllmurray	Wally McIllmurray	John & Audrey Langford	2:27 2/5 †	$15,280
1958- 1964	No Races	-	--	No Races	No Races	0:00 0/0	000
1957	Captain Wright	5	Vic Rowntree	Vic Rowntree	Armstrong Bros.	2:06 0/0	$3,720
1956	Clark Herbert	5	Levi McFadden	Levi McFadden	Vern Evans	2:16 3/5	$4,000
1955	Richard Hal D	6	Levi McFadden	Levi McFadden	Vern Evans	2:07 2/5	$5,000
1954	Warpath	5	Don Hall	Don Hall	Daniel M. Saunders	2:05 2/5	$5,000
1953	High Lee Baldwin		Joe Dougherty	Marshall Moore	Lafe Morgan	2:06 2/5	$4,000
1952	The Diplomat	9	Vic Rowntree	Vic Rowntree	Alex Parsons	2:07 1/5	$4,000
1951	Malcolm Hanover	5	William Simmons	William Simmons	Ken MacKinnon	2:07 4/5	$4,000
1950	Dr. Stanton	9	Lindy Fraser	Lindy Fraser	Lindy Fraser	2:06 0/0	$5,000
1949	The Diplomat	6	Lew James	Lew James	Alex Parsons	2:05 3/5	$5,000
1948	The Count B	9	John Chapman	Clifford Chapman, Sr.	James W. Brown	2:07 1/5	$3,000
1947	The Count B	8	Clifford Chapman, Sr.	Clifford Chapman, Sr.	James W. Brown	2:08 3/5	$3,000
1946	Blue Again	6	Harold F. Wellwood	Harold Wellwood	R. Warren Leatherdale	2:04 1/5	$2,100
1945	The Count B	6	Clifford Chapman, Sr.	Clifford Chapman, Sr.	James W. Brown	2:08 1/5	$1,800
1944	The Count B	5	Clifford Chapman, Sr.	Clifford Chapman, Sr.	James W. Brown	2:08 3/5	$1,500
1943	Pine Ridge Alex	6	Lew James	Lew James	Alex A. Parsons	2:06 1/5	$1,500
1942	Bert Patch	9	Steadman Craig	Steadman Craig	Steadman Craig & W. E. Wilson	2:08 1/5	$1,500
1941	Miss Vera Bars	6	Gid Litt	Gid Litt	James W. Brown	2:08 1/5	$1,500
1940	Bob Lee	4	Barney Hughes	Barney Hughes	Wilbert J. Hyatt	2:08 3/5	$1,500
1939	Dillon Mc	7	Floyd Milton	Floyd Milton	Dr. W. Norman Meldrum	2:05 3/5	$1,500
1938	Sir Esme	5	Harris Fields	Harris Fields	Dr. W. Norman Meldrum	2:06 0/0	$1,500
1937	Grattan Axworthy	6	Gid Litt	Gid Litt	Walter J. Booth	2:08 0/0	$1,500
1936	Better Times	6	Floyd Milton	Floyd Milton	John S. Koch	2:07 0/0	$1,275

- † run at a distance of 1-3/16 miles.
