= Somebeachsomewhere =

American Standardbred racehorse

- Breed: Standardbred
- Sire: Mach Three
- Grandsire: Matt's Scooter
- Dam: Wheres the Beach
- Damsire: Beach Towel
- Sex: Stallion
- Foaled: 25 May 2005
- Died: 14 January 2018
- Country: Canada
- Colour: Bay
- Breeder: S Smith-Rothaug
- Owner: Schooner Stables
- Trainer: Brent MacGrath
- Record: 21:20-1-0
- Earnings: $3,322,199

Major wins
- Metro Pace (2007); North America Cup (2008); Confederation Cup Pace (2008); Messenger Stakes (2008); Breeders Crown (2008)

Awards
- Canadian Harness Horse of the Year (2007, 2008); United States Harness Horse of the Year (2008)

Honours
- Canadian Horse Racing Hall of Fame (2009); United States Harness Racing Hall of Fame (2015)

Somebeachsomewhere (2005–2018) was a Standardbred Race Horse who, as a three-year-old, tied the world record for a mile (all ages) at The Red Mile with a time of 1:46.4 and earned $3,221,299. In 2008, he had the highest earnings by a pacer in a single season of $2,448,003.

He was sired by Mach Three, out of Wheres The Beach, a Beach Towel mare. The colt was purchased as a yearling for $40,000 and was owned by Schooner Stables of Truro, Nova Scotia.

== 2-Year-Old Campaign ==
He began his racing career in 2007 in the Battle of Waterloo at Grand River Raceway, where he went off as a second favorite in the eliminations and won by three lengths. In the $300,000 final of the event, he won as a 4-5 post time favorite.

After proving his ability on the small track, he moved onto the Metro Pace Eliminations at Mohawk Racetrack. Somebeachsomewhere was drawn into the same elimination as Dali, the fastest two-year-old colt of the year, up to that point. Somebeachsomewhere held off race favorite Dali and won by 3 1/2 lengths in 1:52.1. The next week was the $1 million final of the event, which Somebeachsomewhere won as the race favorite in a world-record 1:49.3.

To finish his two-year-old campaign, he won a pair of stakes races at Mohawk: the Champlain Stakes and the Nasagaweya Stakes.

Somebeachsomewhere earned $773,296 in his freshman year, with a record of six wins in six starts.

== 3-Year-Old Campaign ==
Somebeachsomewhere qualified on 5 May 2008 and put in a mile of 1:51.1 at Mohawk. He was scheduled to make his first start of the season in the first Ontario Sires Stakes Gold Elimination on 17 May. However, an injury resulted in him being scratched from the race. Two weeks later, when he made his 2008 debut, there was some skepticism about his well-being, but he won his division of the Burlington Stakes over Cb flight. .

Following the Burlington, Somebeachsomewhere began preparing for the $1.5 million North America Cup, Canada's richest harness race. Trainer Brent MacGrath was advised not to train the horse in the week leading up to his elimination, yet he won handily in 1:49.0. Over the next week, trainers and drivers of other horses in the final stated that it was simply a race for second place. Somebeachsomewhere went off as a 2-5 favorite and won by 2 3/4 lengths in 1:49.0.

Up next was the $1 million Meadowlands Pace. Somebeachsomewhere drew in to arguably the toughest elimination on 12 July and faced the likes of Badlands Nitro and Art Official. He went off at the 1-5 favorite and pulled away in the stretch to win the elimination by 4 1/2 lengths in a career-best 1:48.3. The following week, he suffered his first loss when he was beaten a head by Art Official in a world record time of 1:47.0. The race fractions were 26.0, 51.4, 1:19.1, and 1:47.0.

Somebeachsomewhere raced in a pair of races at Mohawk on 3 August and 10 August and won both. He then travelled to Flamboro Downs to compete in the Confederation Cup. It was the first time he raced in heats. In his heat, he scored the win in 1:51.3. He drew post two for the final, took the early lead, and went through fractions of 26.1, 55.2, 1:22.4, and 1:49.2, becoming the first three-year-old horse to ever race in under 1:50 on a half-mile track.

MacGrath had stated that he wanted to "prep this horse for a world record in Kentucky" and added that Somebeachsomewhere would likely not attempt a time trial at The Red Mile, as once believed. On 27 September 2008, the colt tied the all-age world race record of 1:46.4 at The Red Mile in the Bluegrass.

On 25 October 2008, Somebeachsomewhere took the final leg of the Pacing Triple Crown when he won the Messenger Stakes at Yonkers Raceway in 1:52.1 over Shadow Play in wet and windy conditions. He made his Woodbine debut on 15 November 2008 and won the Ontario Sires Stakes Super Final by 11 3/4 lengths. The win put him near the $3 million mark in career earnings.

The colt's final race came in the 2008 Breeders Crown at Meadowlands Racetrack with a win in the $500,000 3-year-old colt and gelding pacing division. MacGrath then entered Somebeachsomewhere in the Matron Stakes at Dover Downs, which would have marked his first start on a 5/8 mile track. However, he was scratched from his elimination due to a fever.

Somebeachsomewhere ended his racing career with a record of 20-1-0 in 21 career starts, career earnings of $3,221,299, and a mark of 1:46.4. No three-year-old (as of December 2021) has beaten his 1:46.4 mark although the mark has been since tied twice. (He's Watching in 2014 and Cattlewash in 2020)

On 31 January 2009, Somebeachsomewhere was the unanimous winner of the O'Brien Award for top three-year-old pacing colt. He was also named recipient of the prestigious Cam Fella Award and was named Canadian Horse of the Year. On 4 February 2009, he was the recipient of the Dan Patch Award for U.S. Pacer of the Year and was named the first-ever Canadian-sired U.S. Horse of the Year.

Somebeachsomewhere was retired to Hanover Shoe Farms in Pennsylvania and was bred to 160 mares in 2009. On 12 January 2010, he was selected as Harness Racing's Racehorse Of The Decade, encompassing the years 2000 through 2009. He was elected to the Canadian Horse Racing Hall of Fame less than a year after his last race and inducted into the USTA Living Horse Hall of Fame in 2015. He was diagnosed with a cancerous mass on 19 November 2017. Six weeks of chemotherapy treatment was not successful and the horse had to be euthanized at Mid-Atlantic Veterinary Center in Ringoes, New Jersey.

== Stud Record ==
His first crops of foals have included Captaintreacherous winner of $3.1m and USA 2yo and USA 3yo Pacing Colt of the Year, and other notables including Little Brown Jug winner Limelight Beach, Sunshine Beach and Somewherovrarainbow. At the time of his death he had sired winners of $84.6m and was the leading sire in 2016 and 2017. In 2017 he set a record for standardbred stallions with his progeny earning $23.7m.

== Race record ==
Date	Track	Race	Purse	Finish	Time	Last 1/4	Odds	Driver	Trainer
29 November 2008	Meadowlands	Breeder's Crown F	$500 000	1/1T	1:48.3	26.3	*0.20	Paul MacDonell	Brent MacGrath
15 November 2008	Woodbine	D-OSS-SF	$300 000	1/11T	1:50.3	29.3	*0.05	Paul MacDonell	Brent MacGrath
25 October 2008	Yonkers	Messenger	$650 000	1/NK	1:52.1	27.4	*0.30	Paul MacDonell	Brent MacGrath
4 October 2008	Red Mile	Tattersalls	$293 000	1/3H	1:47.4	26.2	*0.05	Paul MacDonell	Brent MacGrath
27 September 2008	Red Mile	Bluegrass	$134 000	1/7H	1:46.4	27.2	*0.05	Paul MacDonell	Brent MacGrath
6 September 2008	Mohawk	D-Simcoe	$132 326	1/1T	1:50.1	29.4	*0.05	Paul MacDonell	Brent MacGrath
17 August 2008	Flamboro	Confed F	$493 000	1/4	1:49.2	26.3	*0.15	Paul MacDonell	Brent MacGrath
17 August 2008	Flamboro	Confed E	$50 000	1/1T	1:51.3	26.4	*0.05	Paul MacDonell	Brent MacGrath
10 August 2008	Mohawk	D-OSS-GF	$180 000	1/4T	1:49.2	27.4	*0.05	Paul MacDonell	Brent MacGrath
3 August 2008	Mohawk	3Yr Open	$50 000	1/2T	1:49.0	26.3	*0.05	Paul MacDonell	Brent MacGrath
19 July 2008	Meadowlands	M Pace F	$1 100 000	2/NK	1:47.0	27.4	*0.10	Paul MacDonell	Brent MacGrath
12 July 2008	Meadowlands	M Pace E	$50 000	1/4H	1:48.3	26.2	*0.20	Paul MacDonell	Brent MacGrath
14 June 2008	Mohawk	D-NA Cup F	$1 500 000	1/2T	1:49.0	27.0	*0.40	Paul MacDonell	Brent MacGrath
7 June 2008	Mohawk	D-NA Cup E	$50 000	1/2	1:49.0	27.1	*0.30	Paul MacDonell	Brent MacGrath
31 May 2008	Mohawk	D-Burlington	$100 000	1/1H	1:51.3	28.1	*0.25	Paul MacDonell	Brent MacGrath
5 May 2008	Mohawk	QUAL	$0	1/10T	1:51.1	27.1	NB	Paul MacDonell	Brent MacGrath
15 September 2007	Mohawk	D-Nasagaweya	$145 300	1/2	1:51.4	28.2	*0.10	Paul MacDonell	Jean Louis Arsenault
8 September 2007	Mohawk	D-Champlain	$115 884	1/3Q	1:51.0	26.0	*0.05	Paul MacDonell	Jean Louis Arsenault
1 September 2007	Mohawk	D-Metro	$1 000 000	1/2	1:49.3	27.4	*1.75	Paul MacDonell	Jean Louis Arsenault
25 August 2007	Mohawk	D-Metro E	$40 000	1/3H	1:52.1	27.4	5.15	Paul MacDonell	Jean Louis Arsenault
6 August 2007	Grand River	Battle of Waterloo	$300 000	1/2Q	1:55.0	29.0	*0.85	Paul MacDonell	Jean Louis Arsenault
30 July 2007	Grand River	Battle of Waterloo E	$24 000	1/3	1:54.2	28.0	1.60	Paul MacDonell	Jean Louis Arsenault
8 July 2007	Truro	QUAL	$0	1/10	2:00.1	28.2	NB	Brent MacGrath	Brent MacGrath
1 July 2007	Truro	QUAL	$0	1/5Q	2:02.1	29.0	NB	Brent MacGrath	Brent MacGrath
24 June 2007	Truro	QUAL	$0	1/3Q	2:04.3	30.1	NB	Brent MacGrath	Brent MacGrath

HD - head; NK - neck; Q - 1/4 length; H - half length; T - 3/4 length
