= Brad Grant =

Canadian businessman

- Born: Bradley J. Grant
- Occupations: Businessman, investor, philanthropist, standardbred horse owner
- Relatives: John Grant (father)

Bradley "Brad" J. Grant is a Canadian businessman, investor, philanthropist, and standardbred horse owner from Milton, Ontario. He is the former owner of the Milton Icehawks (previously known as the Milton Merchants), which is part of the Ontario Junior Hockey League.

== Early life ==
Grant was born in 1954 or 1955 to Kathleen "Kay" and John Grant, owner of J.B. Grant Trucking, a company that hauled cement in Ontario. Brad has four sisters and one brother.

Grant's roots in harness racing stretch back to his childhood. He spent a lot of time on his father's standardbred breeding farm in Hornby, which he purchased in 1965. John Grant, who was inducted into the Canadian Horse Racing Hall of Fame as a builder in 1998, bred and raced a notable list of provincial stars including Hornby Glory, Hornby Tora, Hornby Judy, Armbro Luxury, and Classic Wish. Brad opted not to continue his father's Hornby breeding operation.

The elder John was not only involved in the trucking business, but also the golf course business as well as horse racing.

== Business career ==
=== Trucking Ownership ===
Grant established his own trucking company, Active Transport, in 1983. His father owned and operated John Grant Haulage, but it is now a family-owned business that is run by Brad. John Grant Haulage has 57 trucks in operation.

In 2015, Grant's investment company purchased a controlling interest in the transportation company, Hutton Transport from St. Marys Cement. His company also maintains financial interests in "a number of working transport companies" including Active Transport and Movin' Freight.

=== Sports ===
==== Hockey teams ====
Grant purchased the Tier-II Jr. A hockey team, the Milton Steamers in April 1986 around the time the organization was speculated to fold. During the 1986-87 season, he changed the team's name from the Steamers to the Merchants, and brought in former coach Gerry Inglis. Inglis had prior experience coaching the Georgetown Raiders and had won five intermediate championships at the time.

Grant led the team to tremendous success in the late 1990s. During his 15-year ownership run, the team captured four division crowns, three league championships and a provincial title.

In 1992, the Milton Merchants were Central Junior B Hockey League champions with a 4-2 victory in Game 7 over the Aurora Eagles. They made the Ontario Hockey Association Sutherland Cup Junior B championship, but lost five games to the Mid-Western Junior B Hockey League's Kitchener Dutchmen.

The 1994-95 season marked the beginning of a historical run for the franchise as the club won five straight division titles. The surge of success increased when the Merchants were crowned league champions in 1997, winning the Buckland Trophy after defeating the Newmarket 87's. In the 1997 Dudley Cup playoffs, the Rayside-Balfour Sabrecats (NOJHL) beat Milton four games to one.

In 1998, the Milton Merchants repeated their Buckland Trophy title, dispatching the Newmarket Hurricanes this time, and then went on to become Central Canadian Junior A Champions by winning the Dudley Hewitt Cup, defeating the Rayside-Balfour Sabrecats (NOJHL) four games to two, and exacting revenge for the previous year's loss to Rayside-Balfour.

At the 1998 Royal Bank Cup, the Milton Merchants went 1-3 in round robin play. In the semifinal game, Milton lost 6-2 to the South Surrey Eagles and were eliminated from the tournament.

In 2001, Grant sold the team to a trio that consisted of ex-NHLer Dave Gagner, then-owner of the Mississauga IceDogs Mario Forgione, and wine distillery consultant Ken Chase.

==== Standardbred Horse Racing ====
In the 1970s, Charles Juravinski tried to get a new racetrack off the ground just outside Hamilton, Ontario. Juravinski was introduced to John Grant, Brad's father, who joined in on the venture. With the help of John Grant, Juravinski succeeded in founding his new racetrack in 1971. The half-mile harness horse racing track was named Flamboro Downs.

Flamboro Downs proved to be a wise move for Grant as the Hamilton-area racetrack was extremely well received after opening in April 1975. During the first year of opening, Juravinski got to know John Grant's son, Brad. Years later John Grant sold his stake in Flamboro Downs due to health concerns, much to Juravinski's dismay. Many years later Juravinski and the younger Grant joined forces to co-own a horse named American Rock.

In 1997, Brad Grant got drawn back into the horse racing industry through the ownership of horses.

On January 4, 2016, a devastating barn fire at Classy Lane Training Centre in Puslinch, Ontario killed 43 horses. Grant himself lost four of his horses in the fire — millionaire older pacer Apprentice Hanover, unraced three-year-old pacing mare Proven Effective, older gelded pacer Whiskey N Pie (a winner of $47,000 on the track) and older gelded pacer Whistle Jimmy K, who earned more than $47,000 racing.

Two weeks later, Grant traveled to New Jersey where he spent $275,000 USD on three racehorses to be trained by Guelph native Ben Wallace, who had lost all 17 horses due to the Classy Lane fire.

== Personal life ==
Grant is an active philanthropist who serves the Milton District Hospital Foundation as vice chair and is a past chair of the foundation. He has donated thousands of dollars to the hospital foundation through his personal donations as well as donations from his trucking companies. He is also the finance chairman of the Ontario Hockey Association. Grant lives in Milton, Ontario. He is married to his wife Bonnie.
