= Abercrombie (horse) =

American Standardbred racehorse

- Sire: Silent Majority
- Dam: Bergdorf
- Damsire: Duane Hanover
- Sex: Stallion
- Foaled: May 13, 1975
- Country: USA
- Color: Bay
- Breeder: Walnut Hall Farm
- Owner: L. Keith Bulen & Shirley A. Mitchell
- Trainer: Glen Garnsey
- Earnings: $984,391
- Gait: Pace
- Driver: Glen Garnsey
- Mile record: 1:53

Major wins
- Messenger Stakes (1978); Prix d'Été (1978); Adios Pace (1978); Confederation Cup Pace (1978)

Awards
- United States Harness Horse of the Year (1978)

Honours
- United States Harness Racing Hall of Fame (1999)
- Last updated on November 2016

Abercrombie (May 13, 1975 – November 14, 2000) was a bay Standardbred world-record-holding pacer and winner of the E. Roland Harriman Award for Harness Horse of the Year in 1978, who went on to become one of the sport's leading sires.

== Bloodlines ==
By Silent Majority out of Bergdorf by Duane Hanover, he was sold at the Tattersalls auction for $9,500 to Keith Bulen and Shirley Mitchell. Abercrombie's dam, Bergdorf, was a leading broodmare; although he was her fastest foal, 10 of her 12 foals made it to the races.

== Racing career ==
Jerry Landess was his first trainer, and Cecil Peacock, a full-time school bus driver, succeeded Landess as Abercrombie's trainer for his two-year-old season. When his talent became apparent he was turned over to Glen Garnsey, his trainer-driver. In 20 starts as a two-year-old Abercrombie won seven times and finished second and third three times each, earning $49,379; his fastest time that season was 1:56 at The Red Mile.

Abercrombie won 22 of his 33 races in 1978, including the Messenger Stakes, the Prix d'Été, and the Adios Stakes, and earned $703,260. His best time for the mile was 1:53 (then a world record which stood for three years), set as a 4-year-old in August 1979 at the Meadowlands Racetrack in East Rutherford, New Jersey.

== At stud ==
Abercrombie retired in 1979 to become an important sire at Castleton Farm in Lexington, Kentucky (where he was syndicated for $3 million), helping to return the Adios line to prominence. As of May 2004, his offspring have won over $149 million. Abercrombie sired more than 1,700 foals; 11 of his offspring earned more than $1 million each (including Artsplace, Harness Horse of the Year in 1992, who earned $3,085,083), and 432 have earned over $100,000. Among Abercrombie's other well-known progeny are Life Sign, Armbro Emerson, Anniecrombie, Missisippin, Misfit, Kentucky Spur, Goliath Bayama, Dontgetinmyway, Albert Albert and Armbro Dallas. His descendants have been successful both on the track and in the breeding shed; of his 1,574 offspring who have raced, 1,120 have paced below 2:00 and 403 have taken marks below 1:55.

Abercrombie was inducted into the United States Harness Racing Hall of Fame in 1999. He died the following year, and is buried at the Castleton Farm horse cemetery.

== Sire line tree ==
- Abercrombie
  - Artsplace
    - Artiscape
      - Yankee Cruiser
        - Sweet Lou
    - Grinfromeartoear
      - Mr Feelgood
