= Matt's Scooter =

American Standardbred racehorse

- Breed: Standardbred
- Sire: Direct Scooter
- Grandsire: Sampson Direct
- Dam: Ellen's Glory
- Damsire: Meadow Skipper
- Sex: Ridgling
- Foaled: 1985
- Country: United States
- Colour: Bay
- Breeder: Max Gerson
- Owner: Gordon Rumpel, Illa Rumpel & Charles Juravinski
- Trainer: Harry J. Poulton
- Record: 61:37-?-?
- Earnings: $2,455,609

Major wins
- Meadowlands Pace (1988); Messenger Stakes (1988); Prix d'Été (1988); Gold Cup Invitational Pace (1989); Breeders Crown Open Pace (1989)

Awards
- American Harness Horse of the Year (1989); American Pacer of the Year (1988, 1989); Canadian Harness Horse of the Year (1989)

Honors
- Canadian Horse Racing Hall of Fame (2006); United States Horse Racing Hall of Fame (2006)

Matt's Scooter (1985 – June 30, 2014) was a Standardbred pacer and sire who was named Harness Horse of the Year in 1989. Matt's Scooter competed as a pacer in harness racing, winning the Meadowlands Pace, Prix d'Été, Confederation Cup, Messenger Stakes, American National Stakes, Breeders Crown, Driscoll Series, Mohawk Gold Cup, he was named Pacer of the Year in 1988 and 1989, and Harness Horse of the Year in 1989 by the United States Harness Association.

== Background ==
Matt's Scooter was a bay ridgeling bred by Max Gerson of New York. He was sired by Direct Scooter out of Ellen's Glory by Meadow Skipper. As a yearling, he was bought for $17,500 by Gordon and Illa Rumpel of Calgary, and Charles Juravinski. He was trained by Harry Poulton at his base near Lake Scugog, Ontario.

== Racing career ==
As two-year-old, Matt's Scooter was given a relatively light campaign winning three of his nine races. He was not an easy horse to handle: Poulton described him as "always bucking, kicking or doing something... he wanted to do everything 100 miles an hour".

In 1988, despite being ineligible for the Cane Pace and the Little Brown Jug, Matt's Scooter earned $1.78 million winning eleven of his twenty two races. His major victories included the Meadowlands Pace and the Messenger Stakes.

In Autumn 1988, he paced a mile in 1:48.2 at the Red Mile in Lexington, Kentucky, lowering the world record previously held by Niatross, by four-fifths of a second.

As a four-year-old he won 23 of his thirty races and earned $1.14 million.

== Honors and awards ==
Matt's Scooter was named Pacer of the Year and best three-year-old in 1988. In the following year, he was again named best pacer and was awarded the title of Harness Horse of the Year. Matt's Scooter was inducted into the Canadian Horse Racing Hall of Fame and the United States Horse Racing Hall of Fame in 2006.

== Retirement and stud career ==
He was retired from racing after 4 years, and stood as a breeding stallion for Perretti Farms in Cream Ridge, New Jersey. He was pensioned from stud duty in 2011. Bob Marks of Perretti Farms said "His libido is willing, but with his hind suspensory, we're afraid he could hurt himself".

Matt's Scooter was euthanised at Mid-Atlantic Equine Clinic in Ringoes, New Jersey on June 30, 2014.

== Sire line tree ==
- Matt's Scooter
  - Mach Three
    - Somebeachsomewhere

== Pedigree ==
Pedigree of Matt's Scooter (USA), bay ridgling, 1985
Sire Direct Scooter (USA) 1976	Sampson Direct (USA); 1957	Sampson Hanover	Volomite
Sire Direct Scooter (USA) 1976	Sampson Direct (USA); 1957	Sampson Hanover	Irene Hanover
Sire Direct Scooter (USA) 1976	Sampson Direct (USA); 1957	Dottie Rosecroft	Billy Direct
Sire Direct Scooter (USA) 1976	Sampson Direct (USA); 1957	Dottie Rosecroft	Beam's Hanover
Sire Direct Scooter (USA) 1976	Noble Claire (USA); 1969	Noble Victory	Victory Song
Sire Direct Scooter (USA) 1976	Noble Claire (USA); 1969	Noble Victory	Emily's Pride
Sire Direct Scooter (USA) 1976	Noble Claire (USA); 1969	Scotch Claire	Scotland
Sire Direct Scooter (USA) 1976	Noble Claire (USA); 1969	Scotch Claire	Abbey Claire
Dam Ellen's Glory (USA) 1978	Meadow Skipper (USA); 1960	Dale Frost	Hal Dale
Dam Ellen's Glory (USA) 1978	Meadow Skipper (USA); 1960	Dale Frost	Galloway
Dam Ellen's Glory (USA) 1978	Meadow Skipper (USA); 1960	Countess Vivian	King's Counsel
Dam Ellen's Glory (USA) 1978	Meadow Skipper (USA); 1960	Countess Vivian	Filly Direct
Dam Ellen's Glory (USA) 1978	Gloria Barmin (USA); 1968	Greentree Adios	Adios
Dam Ellen's Glory (USA) 1978	Gloria Barmin (USA); 1968	Greentree Adios	Martha Lee
Dam Ellen's Glory (USA) 1978	Gloria Barmin (USA); 1968	Adept Hanover	Tar Heel
Dam Ellen's Glory (USA) 1978	Gloria Barmin (USA); 1968	Adept Hanover	Arbutus Hanover
