= Artsplace =

American Standardbred racehorse

- Sire: Ambercrombie
- Grandsire: Silent Majority
- Dam: Miss Elvira
- Damsire: Albatross
- Sex: Stallion
- Foaled: 1988
- Died: 30 October 2006
- Country: USA
- Colour: Bay
- Breeder: George Segal
- Owner: George Segal; Brian Monieson
- Trainer: Gene Riegle; Robert McIntosh
- Record: 49: 37-7-1
- Earnings: $3,085,083

Major wins
- Breeders Crown 2YO Colt & Gelding Pace (1990); Metro Pace (1990); Governor's Cup (1990); James Dancer Memorial (1991); Breeders Crown Open Pace (1992); Canadian Pacing Derby (1992); U.S. Pacing Championship (1992); Governor Driscoll Pace (1992)

Awards
- USA 2 Year Old Colt Pacer of the Year (1990); American Harness Horse of the Year (1992); Canadian Harness Horse of the Year (1992)

Honors
- United States Harness Racing Hall of Fame; Canadian Horse Racing Hall of Fame; Leading Standardbred Sire in North America (1997-2000, 2002-03)
- Last updated on 2016-01-26

Artsplace (1988–2006) was a champion Standardbred horse who was the 1992 American Harness Horse of the Year.

== Racing career ==
Artsplace was harness racing's champion two-year-old in 1990, where he notably set a world record for 2-year-old pacers by winning the Breeders Crown in the time of 1:51.1 at Pompano Park in Florida, soundly defeating champion Die Laughing and breaking the previous record by two seconds. This record was not tied until 2007 and broken until 2008. He won 11 of 15 starts as a 2 year old and earned $1,180,271.

Artsplace's 3-year old campaign was marred by injuries, though he still earned over $900,000 and won several major stakes races including the Dancer Memorial and American National and finished second in the Meadowlands Pace as he battled it out with Die Laughing and Precious Bunny, the latter of whom went on to garner horse of the year honors. He won 10 of 15 starts and $972,487 in 1991.

Artsplace's connections decided to return the horse to the races at age 4. Fully healthy, Artsplace had arguably the greatest season in harness racing history, going undefeated and winning such races as the Breeders Crown, US Pacing Championship, and American National, among many others. Driven throughout his career by Hall of Famer John Campbell, Artsplace paced a mile in 1:49 2/5, which was at the time the fastest race mile in harness racing history. He also won the final of the Driscoll Series at The Meadowlands. In his Harness Horse of the Year season of 1992 he was undefeated in 16 starts and won $932,325. Artsplace entered the breeding shed with a lifetime summary of 49 37-7-1 ($3,085,083), retired as the second-richest pacer of all time, and set at least one world record in each of his three years of competition.

In a poll by harness racing experts commissioned by the U.S. Trotting Association, Artsplace was voted the 10th-greatest harness horse in history. The fans voted him the 12th-greatest.

== Stud record ==
At stud, Artsplace was a producer of top horses from the time his first crop raced in 1996. He regularly dominated the breeding statistics for several years, with his progeny earning $173 million including 18 having earned at least $1 million by the time of his election to the Canadian Horse Racing Hall of Fame. Artsplace sired numerous champion horses, including millionaires Artiscape, Art Major, Worldly Beauty, Galleria, Grinfromeartoear, Art's Conquest, Astreos, Arturo and Glowing Report, among many others. He was the leading sire in North America six times. Many of Artsplace's sons and daughters have gone on to sire champions themselves, including most recently Art Major, who sired 2008 Meadowlands Pace champion Art Official, winner of the 2008 Pace in 1:47 which was, at the time, a world record time for 3 year old pacers and the second fastest race mile in harness racing history.

Artsplace was euthanized at the age of 18 in 2006 due to complications of laminitis, which he had been suffering with for some time.

== Sire line tree ==
- Artsplace
  - Artiscape
    - Yankee Cruiser
      - Sweet Lou
  - Grinfromeartoear
    - Mr Feelgood
