= Mohawk Racetrack =

Harness racing track in Ontario

Coordinates: 43.4955°N 80.0004°W

Woodbine Mohawk Park
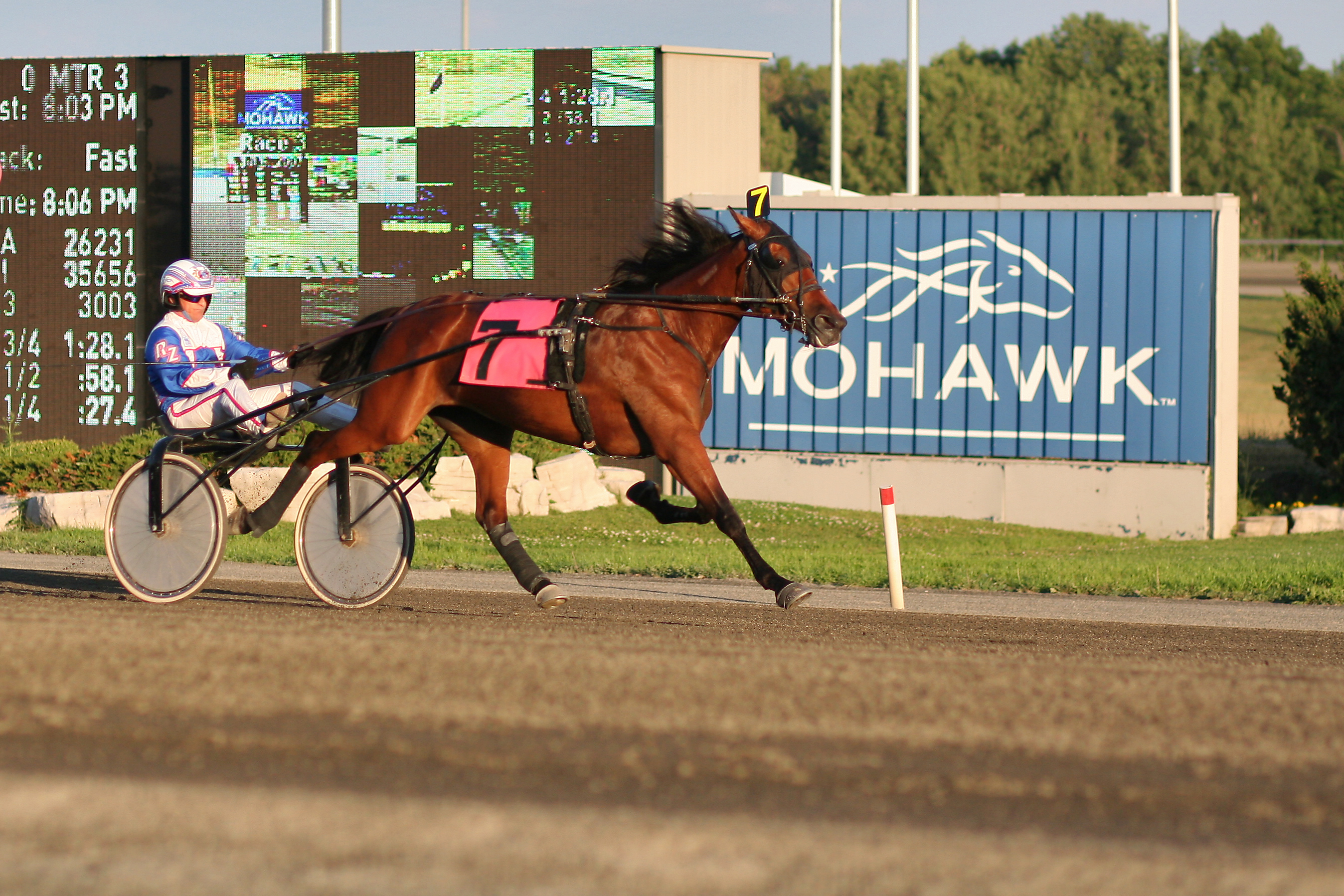
- Interactive map of Woodbine Mohawk Park
- Location: 9430 Guelph Line; Campbellville, Ontario; L0P 1B0
- Owned by: Woodbine Entertainment Group
- Date opened: April 26, 1963; 63 years ago
- Race type: Harness Racing
- Notable races: Pepsi North America Cup; Mohawk Million; Metro Pace; Canadian Pacing Derby; Canadian Trotting Classic; Maple Leaf Trot

Mohawk Racetrack (renamed Woodbine Mohawk Park in 2018) is a harness racing track in Campbellville, Ontario. It is owned by Woodbine Entertainment Group (known as Ontario Jockey Club until 2001) and is about 40 km southwest of the company's other racetrack, Woodbine Racetrack for Thoroughbred racing in Toronto, Ontario. Woodbine Mohawk Park also has a large slot machine parlour with over 1,000 slot machines, which is operated by Great Canadian Entertainment; some of the revenue from this operation is used to increase the horseracing purses. Ken Middleton is the longtime track announcer.

== History ==
The track was opened on April 26, 1963, by the then Ontario Jockey Club as Mohawk Racetrack, and 4,338 people attended. The 400-acre site was constructed at a cost of $3.5 million; it could house 828 horses in the barns and had enough parking for 3,000 cars. The very first Canadian Standardbred Horse Society Yearling Sale took place at the Woodbine Sales Arena, with 30 yearlings cataloged.

The Ontario Jockey Club changed its name to Woodbine Entertainment Group in 2001; in June 2017, Woodbine Entertainment Group announced an investment that would result in Mohawk being upgraded to accommodate year-round harness racing. Following the closure of Woodbine Racetrack's harness track in early 2018 for conversion to a turf course for Thoroughbred racing, Mohawk opened under the new brand name of Woodbine Mohawk Park.

Mohawk has frequently hosted the year-end Breeders Crown events, most recently in 2025.

== Track specifications ==
The track is 7/8 mile (1.4 km) in circumference (originally 5/8 mile or 1 kilometre) and is made of crushed limestone. It can accommodate ten starters behind the gate. The homestretch is 1,095 feet (334 m) long, and the far turn has a larger radius than the clubhouse turn to encourage acceleration into the homestretch. There is no hubrail. Racing is usually on Mondays, Thursdays, Fridays, and Saturdays. Tuesday racing is held from June to early October. Post time is usually 7:10 PM. Some days have special post times.

== Races ==
Some of the major stake's races run at Mohawk include:

- Pepsi North America Cup for 3-year-old pacers, which carries a purse of CA$1,000,000 and is Canada's richest race for pacers. Mohawk hosted the event for the first time in 2007 when it was won by Tell All.
- The Mohawk Million, first run in 2020, is for 2-year-old trotters with a CA$1,000,000 purse. Nine of the ten starting gate positions must be purchased in advance for CA$100,000 each, which can then be sold, traded or leased before the race. The final starting gate slot goes to the winner of Mohawk's William Wellwood Memorial.
- Metro Pace is a one-mile race for 2-year-old pacers. Known as a launching ground to greatness for horses such as Artsplace, Rocknroll Hanover, and Somebeachsomewhere. There is currently a tied race record of 1:49.2 for Captaintreacherous (2012) and Sportswriter (2009).
- Canadian Pacing Derby for Free For All pacers with an estimated purse of $600,000 and was first held in 1936.
- Canadian Trotting Classic is a one-mile race for 3-year-old trotters and is Canada's richest race for trotters with a purse of $605,000. It has been won by many of the sport's greatest trotters such as Father Patrick, Muscle Hill, Deweycheatumnhowe, and Kadabra. The race record is currently held by What The Hill at 1:51.4
- Maple Leaf Trot is a one-mile trotting event for horses of all-ages launched in 1950
