= Breeders Crown 3YO Filly Trot =

- Location: North America
- Inaugurated: 1984 (42 years ago)
- Race type: Harness race for Standardbred trotters

Race information
- Distance: 1 mile (1,609 metres or 8 furlongs)
- Surface: Dirt
- Qualification: 2-year-olds
- Purse: $910,365 (2025)

The Breeders Crown 3YO Filly Trot is a harness racing event for three-year-old Standardbred filly trotters. It is one part of the Breeders Crown annual series of twelve races for both Standardbred trotters and pacers. First run in 1984, it is contested over a distance of one mile. Race organizers have awarded the event to various racetracks across North America.

== Historical race events ==
In 1989, Peace Corps won this race in her age group, having already won the 1988 Breeders Crown 2YO Filly Trot in World Record time. She would go on to set another World Record in winning the 1990 Breeders Crown Open Mare Trot and then win that race again in 1992, making her the only horse in history to win four Breeders Crown races.

== North American locations ==
- Woodbine Racetrack (Wdb) Ontario (9)
- Meadowlands Racetrack (Mxx) New Jersey (8)
- Pompano Park (Ppk) Florida (7)
- Mohawk Raceway (Moh) Ontario (6)
- Harrah's Hoosier Park (HoP) Indiana (3)
- Pocono Downs (Pcd) Pennsylvania (2)
- Rosecroft Raceway (Rcr) Maryland (2)
- Colonial Downs (Cln) Virginia (1)
- Freehold Raceway (Fhl) New Jersey (1)
- Garden State Park (Gsp) New Jersey (1)
- Vernon Downs (Vdx) New York (1)

== Records ==
Most wins by a driver

- 6 – Brian Sears (2003, 2004, 2005, 2009, 2013, 2019)

Most wins by a trainer

- 4 – Trond Smedshammer (2003, 2004, 2005, 2019)

Stakes record

- 1:51 1/5 – Jiggy Jog S (2022), Allegiant (2024)

== Winners of the Breeders Crown 3YO Filly Trot ==
| Year | Winner | Driver | Trainer | Owner | Time | Purse | Track |
|---|---|---|---|---|---|---|---|
| 2025 | Yo Tillie | Todd McCarthy | Andrew Harris | Andrew Harris, Bill Pollock, Bruce Areman | 1:51 3/5 | $910,365 | Moh |
| 2024 | Allegiant | Scott Zeron | Linda Toscano | Ryan W. Smith | 1:51 1/5 | $600,000 | Mxx |
| 2023 | Bond | Ake Svanstedt | Ake Svanstedt | Ake Svanstedt Inc., Little E LLC, L Berg Inc. | 1:51 2/5 | $600,000 | HoP |
| 2022 | Jiggy Jog S | Dexter Dunn | Ake Svanstedt | Jorgen Sparredal Inc. | 1:51 1/5 | $675,000 | Moh |
| 2021 | Bella Bellini | Dexter Dunn | Richard "Nifty" Norman | David McDuffee | 1:53 0/0 | $650,000 | Mxx |
| 2020 | Next Level Stuff | Tim Tetrick | Jim Campbell | Runthetable Stables | 1:52 0/0 | $500,000 | HoP |
| 2019 | Winndevie | Brian Sears | Trond Smedshammer | Purple Haze Stable | 1:53 0/0 | $500,000 | Moh |
| 2018 | Lily Stride | Tim Tetrick | Mark Harder | Emilio & Maria Rosati | 1:53 2/5 | $550,000 | Pcd |
| 2017 | Ariana G | Yannick Gingras | Jimmy Takter | Marvin Katz, Al Libfeld | 1:54 3/5 | $500,000 | HoP |
| 2016 | Broadway Donna | David Miller | Jim Campbell | Fashion Farms LLC | 1:53 1/5 | $500,000 | Mxx |
| 2015 | Wild Honey | John Campbell | Jimmy Takter | Christina Takter, John Fielding & Herb Liverman | 1:54 3/5 | $500,000 | Wdb |
| 2014 | Shake It Cerry | Ronald Pierce | Jimmy Takter | Solveig's Racing Partners | 1:52 2/5 | $500,000 | Mxx |
| 2013 | Bee A Magician | Brian Sears | Richard "Nifty" Norman | Mel Hartman, Dave McDuffee & Herb Liverman | 1:52 4/5 | $500,000 | Pcd |
| 2012 | Maven | Yannick Gingras | Jonas Czernyson | William J. Donovan | 1:54 0/0 | $500,000 | Wdb |
| 2011 | Cedar Dove | Ronald Pierce | Noel Daley | John Fielding & Adam Victor & Son Stable | 1:53 3/5 | $500,000 | Wdb |
| 2010 | Impressive Kemp | Ronald Pierce | Noel Daley | Jean E. Cloutier | 1:54 4/5 | $500,000 | Pcd |
| 2009 | Broadway Schooner | Brian Sears | Jim Campbell | Arlene & Jules Siegel | 1:56 0/0 | $650,000 | Wdb |
| 2008 | Kadealia | Tim Tetrick | George Teague, Jr. | Elmer G. Fannin | 1:56 1/5 | $500,000 | Mxx |
| 2007 | Southwind Serena | Yannick Gingras | Per Henriksen | Andrea Lea Racing Stable | 1:55 2/5 | $500,000 | Mxx |
| 2006 | Susie's Magic | David Miller | Anthony O'Sullivan | L & L DeVisser & William Jones | 1:55 4/5 | $500,000 | Wdb |
| 2005 | Blur | Brian Sears | Trond Smedshammer | Barry Goldstein | 1:56 1/5 | $500,000 | Mxx |
| 2004 | Housethatruthbuilt | Brian Sears | Trond Smedshammer | Patricia Spinelli & Theodore Gewertz | 1:53 3/5 | $550,000 | Wdb |
| 2003 | Stroke Play | Brian Sears | Trond Smedshammer | Jorgen Jahre, Jr. | 1:55 2/5 | $525,000 | Mxx |
| 2002 | Cameron Hall | Trevor Ritchie | Robert A. Stewart | Erkki Laakkonen | 1:55 4/5 | $592,500 | Wdb |
| 2001 | Syrinx Hanover | John Campbell | Chris Marino | Need To Know Stables | 1:55 1/5 | $450,000 | Wdb |
| 2000 | Aviano | Trevor Ritchie | William Wellwood | Armstrong Bros. | 1:56 0/0 | $450,000 | Moh |
| 1999 | Oolong | Ronald Pierce | Per Henriksen | Scott Jason Stb, P H Stb, Lost Revenue Stb & Rich N Poor Stb | 1:56 0/0 | $450,000 | Moh |
| 1998 | Lassie's Goal | Mark O'Mara | Mark O'Mara | Rompaway Farms & Waldo Frankenstein | 1:54 3/5 | $490,000 | Cln |
| 1997 | No Nonsense Woman | James F. Doherty | James F. Doherty | J. F. Doherty & Helen & Frank Rubinetti | 1:56 2/5 | $375,000 | Moh |
| 1996 | Personal Banner | Peter Wrenn | Bill Gallagher | Gina Biasuzzi Stable | 1:54 1/5 | $350,000 | Vdx |
| 1995 | Lookout Victory | John F. Patterson, Jr. | Per Eriksson | Olle Leven | 1:57 3/5 | $325,000 | Wdb |
| 1994 | Imageofa Clear Day | Bill O'Donnell | Doug McIntosh | Earl A. Scheelar | 1:55 2/5 | $375,000 | Gsp |
| 1993 | Expressway Hanover | Per Henriksen | Per Henriksen | Paul E. Spears, Shaun Eisenhauer & Donald Tortorice | 1:55 4/5 | $300,000 | Ppk |
| 1992 | Imperfection | Michel Lachance | Ron Gurfein | Imperfection Stable | 1:57 0/0 | $300,000 | Ppk |
| 1991 | Twelve Speed | Ron Waples | Mark Loewe | Alwin Schockemoehle | 1:57 0/0 | $413,406 | Ppk |
| 1990 | Me Maggie | Berndt O. Lindstedt | Jan Johnson | Arden Homestead Stable | 1:57 1/5 | $378,933 | Ppk |
| 1989 | Peace Corps | John Campbell | Tommy Haughton | AB Gnagget | 1:57 0/0 | $335,701 | Ppk |
| 1988 | Nalda Hanover | Myles McNichol | Sören Nordin | Gina Biasuzzi Stable | 2:02 0/0 | $351,506 | Rcr |
| 1987 | Armbro Fling | George Sholty | George Sholty | Armstrong Bros. | 1:57 3/5 | $390,662 | Ppk |
| 1986 | JEF's Spice | Bill O'Donnell | Jim Gluhm | EF's Standardbred C.C. & North Woodland Stable | 1:59 0/0 | $470,850 | Fhl |
| 1985 | Armbro Devona | Bill O'Donnell | Charles Sylvester | Jack M. Lenavitt, Lawrence Birndorf, Paul Frankel & Jend Ent. | 1:57 3/5 | $418,553 | Ppk |
| 1984 | Fancy Crown | Bill O'Donnell | Ted Andrews | Fancy Crown Stable | 1:59 2/5 | $365,000 | Rcr |
