= Breeders Crown 2YO Filly Trot =

- Location: North America
- Inaugurated: 1984 (42 years ago)
- Race type: Harness race for Standardbred trotters

Race information
- Distance: 1 mile (1,609 metres or 8 furlongs)
- Surface: Dirt
- Qualification: 2-year-olds
- Purse: $700,000 (2023)

The Breeders 2YO Filly Trot is a harness racing event for two-year-old Standardbred filly trotters. It is one part of the Breeders Crown annual series of twelve races for both Standardbred trotters and pacers. First run in 1985, it is contested over a distance of one mile. Race organizers have awarded the event to various racetracks across North America.

== Historical race events ==
Peace Corps won the race in 1988 in world record time. She went on to win her age group again in the 1989 Breeders Crown 3YO Filly Trot and won the 1990 Breeders Crown Open Mare Trot and that same race again in 1992, making her the only horse in history to win four Breeders Crown races.

== North American Locations ==
- Woodbine Racetrack (Wdb) Ontario (9)
- Mohawk Raceway (Moh) Ontario (7)
- Meadowlands Racetrack (Mxx) New Jersey (7)
- Pompano Park (Ppk) Florida (6)
- Harrah's Hooser Park (HoP) Indiana (3)
- Pocono Downs (Pcd) Pennsylvania (3)
- Garden State Park (Gsp) New Jersey (2)
- Colonial Downs (Cln) Virginia (1)
- Hazel Park (Hpx) Michigan (1)
- Canterbury Park (Cby) Minnesota (1)

== Records ==
Most wins by a driver

- 5 – John Campbell (1988, 1991, 2004, 2007, 2008), Yannick Gingras (2012, 2014, 2015, 2016, 2017)

Most wins by a trainer

- 9 – Jimmy Takter (1993, 1996, 2004, 2005, 2012, 2013, 2015, 2016, 2017)

Stakes record

- 1:51 4/5 – Mission Brief (2014)

== Winners of the Breeders Crown 2YO Filly Trot ==
| Year | Winner | Driver | Trainer | Owner | Time | Purse | Track |
|---|---|---|---|---|---|---|---|
| 2023 | Warrawee Michelle | Ake Svanstedt | Ake Svanstedt | Ake Svanstedt Inc., Santandrea Inc., Young Guns | 1:53 4/5 | $700,000 | HoP |
| 2022 | Special Way | Ake Svanstedt | Ake Svanstedt | Brittany Farms, Marvin Katz, Al Libfeld | 1:52 0/0 | $600,000 | Moh |
| 2021 | Joviality S | Brian Sears | Marcus Melander | Courant Inc. | 1:54 4/5 | $600,000 | Mxx |
| 2020 | Lady Chaos | David Miller | Linda Toscano | Richard Gutnick, Thomas Pontone, Joseph Lozito Jr, Enviro Stables Ltd. | 1:54 4/5 | $600,000 | HoP |
| 2019 | Ramona Hill | Andrew McCarthy | Tony Alagna | Brad Grant, Crawford Farms, Robert Leblanc, In The Gym Partners | 1:53 2/5 | $600,000 | Moh |
| 2018 | Woodside Charm | Verlin Yoder | Verlin Yoder | Verlin Yoder | 1:54 0/0 | $675,000 | Pcd |
| 2017 | Manchego | Yannick Gingras | Jimmy Takter | Black Horse Racing, John Fielding, Herb Liverman | 1:54 4/5 | $600,000 | HoP |
| 2016 | Ariana G | Yannick Gingras | Jimmy Takter | Marvin Katz & Alexander J. Libfeld | 1:53 4/5 | $600,000 | Mxx |
| 2015 | All The Time | Yannick Gingras | Jimmy Takter | Marvin Katz & Alexander J. Libfeld | 1:56 2/5 | $600,000 | Wdb |
| 2014 | Mission Brief | Yannick Gingras | Ron Burke | Burke Rcg Stb, Our Horse Cents Stb, J&T Silva, Weaver Bruscemi | 1:51 4/5 | $500,000 | Mxx |
| 2013 | Shake It Cerry | Ronald Pierce | Jimmy Takter | Solveig's Racing Partners | 1:53 4/5 | $500,000 | Pcd |
| 2012 | To Dream On | Yannick Gingras | Jimmy Takter | Marvin Katz & Alexander J. Libfeld | 1:54 4/5 | $600,000 | Wdb |
| 2011 | Check Me Out | Ronald Pierce | Ray Schnittker | Ray Schnittker & Charles Iannazzo | 1:54 4/5 | $600,000 | Wdb |
| 2010 | Martiniontherocks | Ronald Pierce | R. Dustin Jones | Ecurie Synergie | 1:57 0/0 | $600,000 | Pcd |
| 2009 | Poof She's Gone | David Miller | Richard Norman | Mel Hartman, Irving G. Liverman & Dave McDuffee | 1:56 3/5 | $650,000 | Wdb |
| 2008 | Honorable Daughter | John Campbell | Larry Remmen | Paolo Rosanelli & John Siena | 1:55 3/5 | $700,000 | Mxx |
| 2007 | Snow White | John Campbell | Kevin Lare | Jerry Silva, North State Street Stable & Harness The Power | 1:55 1/5 | $650,000 | Mxx |
| 2006 | Possess The Magic | Michel Lachance | Ron Gurfein | Brittany Farms | 1:57 2/5 | $600,000 | Wdb |
| 2005 | Passionate Glide | Ronald Pierce | Jimmy Takter | Brittany Farms | 1:55 4/5 | $516,800 | Mxx |
| 2004 | Flirtin Miss | John Campbell | Jimmy Takter | Brittany Farms | 1:56 1/5 | $558,900 | Wdb |
| 2003 | Forever Scarlet | David Miller | Brett Pelling | Marvin Katz & Alexander J. Libfeld & Samuel Goldband | 1:57 4/5 | $555,000 | Mxx |
| 2002 | Pick Me Up | Luc Ouellette | Darren J. McCall | Mentally Stable, Jerry Silva, David Scharf | 1:57 3/5 | $559,600 | Wdb |
| 2001 | Cameron Hall | Michel Lachance | Robert A. Stewart | Walnut Hall Limited | 1:57 3/5 | $550,000 | Wdb |
| 2000 | Syrinx Hanover | Trevor Ritchie | Chris Marino | Need To Know Stables | 1:55 3/5 | $601,700 | Moh |
| 1999 | Dream of Joy | Jim Meittinis | Per Eriksson | Olle Leven | 1:57 2/5 | $493,600 | Moh |
| 1998 | Musical Victory | Luc Ouellette | Per Eriksson | Brittany Farms | 1:55 3/5 | $402,600 | Cln |
| 1997 | My Dolly | Wally Hennessey | Osvaldo Formia | Lindy Farms of Conn. & FA Stable | 1:59 1/5 | $375,000 | Moh |
| 1996 | Armbro Prowess | Jimmy Takter | Jimmy Takter | Robert Rosenheim | 1:59 2/5 | $350,000 | Moh |
| 1995 | Continentalvictory | Michel Lachance | Ron Gurfein | Deena Frost, Harvey Gold, Hi-Stix & Allister Stable | 1:55 3/5 | $350,000 | Gsp |
| 1994 | Lookout Victory | John F. Patterson, Jr. | Per Eriksson | Olle Leven | 1:57 2/5 | $301,100 | Wdb |
| 1993 | Gleam | Jimmy Takter | Jimmy Takter | Malvern C. Burroughs | 1:58 4/5 | $350,000 | Ppk |
| 1992 | Winky's Goal | Catello Manzi | Charles Sylvester | Allevamento La Sbarra | 1:59 2/5 | $350,000 | Ppk |
| 1991 | Armbro Keepsake | John Campbell | Charles Sylvester | Armstrong Bros. | 1:58 1/5 | $300,000 | Ppk |
| 1990 | Jean Bi | Jan Nordin | Sören Nordin | Gina Biasuzzi Stable | 2:00 3/5 | $489,870 | Ppk |
| 1989 | Delphi's Lobell | Ron Waples | Per Eriksson | Peter Van Drumpt & Domenic DiPiero | 1:59 3/5 | $420,213 | Ppk |
| 1988 | Peace Corps | John Campbell | Tommy Haughton | LPG Standardbred Associates | 1:57 1/5 | $459,219 | Ppk |
| 1987 | Nan's Catch | Berndt O. Lindstedt | Jan Johnson | David & Fredericka Caldwell | 2:00 2/5 | $385,912 | Hpx |
| 1986 | Super Flora | Ron Waples | Jim Miller | Picasso Farms & Douglas Kass | 1:59 2/5 | $472,850 | Cby |
| 1985 | JEF's Spice | Myles McNichol | Jim Gluhm | JEF's Standardbred Country Club | 1:58 4/5 | $514,303 | Gsp |
| 1984 | Conifer | George Sholty | George Sholty | Castleton Farm, Hanley Dawson, Jr. & William Simon | 2:01 2/5 | $447,847 | Moh |

== See also ==
- List of Breeders Crown Winners
