= Shady Daisy =

Harness stakes race for 3-year-old fillies

- Location: Yonkers, New York, U.S. (inaugural); Meadowlands Racing & Entertainment, East Rutherford, New Jersey, U.S. (present)
- Inaugurated: 1957
- Race type: Harness race for standardbred filly pacers

Race information
- Distance: 1 mile (1,609 metres or 8 furlongs)
- Surface: Dirt
- Track: Yonkers Raceway (inaugural); Meadowlands Racetrack (present)
- Qualification: 3-year-olds

The Shady Daisy, formerly the Bronx Filly Pace, is an annual harness racing event for three-year-old standardbred fillies at Meadowlands Racetrack in East Rutherford, New Jersey. It was first contested in 1957 as a companion race to the Cane Pace.

== History ==
Originally run as the Bronx Pace, a stakes race for pacers, it was first held at Yonkers Raceway in Yonkers, New York. The track expanded its Twin Futurities into the Quad Futurities in 1957, introducing the Bronx Pace and Hudson Trot to join the Cane Pace and Yonkers Trot. It served as the first leg of the Yonkers Raceway's Quad Futurities. The Bronx Pace joined the program as the companion race for fillies to the Cane Pace.

The race produced notable filly winners, beginning with Newport Judy and driver Del Cameron. The filly owned by Newport Stock Farm of South Plainfield, New Jersey won the inaugural $22,947.50 stake staged during the Yonkers Raceway's Grand Circuit program on July 20, 1957. The Del Cameron-driven Newport Judy finished first in 2:13 over a mile and one-sixteenth, with Dagsworthy Lady, driven by Delvin Miller, finishing second.

"The Bronx" developed into the United States' richest race for three-year-old pacing fillies. In 1966, the Filly Triple Crown series was formed by the Bronx Pace at Yonkers Raceway, the Lady Maud at Roosevelt Raceway, and the Ladyship Stake at Goshen's Historic Track. The Bronx Filly Pace was the third leg of the series.

With increased entries of sophomore fillies in the 1980s, the race was split into divisions.

For the 1998 season, the Bronx Filly Pace and its companion event, the Cane Pace, were awarded to Freehold Raceway. When it moved to the New Jersey track, it was renamed the Shady Daisy after the former champion mare. The stakes event is owned by Freehold, sponsored by American Racing-Gaming, and administered by the Hambletonian Society. Pocono Downs hosted the Shady Daisy Stakes in 2011 as a result of flooding problems at the earlier scheduled Tioga Downs. The race was held for the first time ever at Tioga Downs in September 2012. Beginning in 2015, the Shady Daisy joined Hambletonian Day at Meadowlands Racetrack in East Rutherford, New Jersey, marking the track as its fifth host.

== Distances ==
The original Bronx Filly feature was raced over a mile and one-sixteenth route. It was later changed to one mile.

== Locations ==
- 1957–1997: Yonkers Raceway, Yonkers, New York, U.S.
- 1998–2010: Freehold Raceway, New Jersey, U.S.
- 2011: Pocono Downs, Wilkes-Barre, Pennsylvania, U.S.
- 2012–2014: Tioga Downs, Nichols, New York, U.S.
- 2015–present: Meadowlands Racetrack, East Rutherford, New Jersey, U.S.

== Records ==
Most wins by a driver

- 4 – Billy Haughton (1962, 1964, 1972, 1973)

== Shady Daisy winners ==
Year	Winner	Driver	Trainer	Owner	Time	Notes
1957	Newport Judy	Del Cameron	—	—	2:13	—
1958	Kwik	Charley Fitzpatrick Jr.	—	Carl Schultze	2:10 4/5	—
1959	Honick Rainbow	Stanley Dancer	—	—	—	—
1960	Rapid Transit	Hugh Bell	—	—	—	—
1961	Sweet Miriam	Frank Darish	—	—	2:11.1	—
1962	Stand By	Billy Haughton	—	Donald MacFarlane	2:10.4	Tied stakes record
1963	Harry's Laura	Clint Hodgins	—	Gertrude & Bert Schaffer	2:02 4/5	Stakes record
1964	Bit O'Sugar	Billy Haughton	—	—	Poppa Joe Farms	Seventh renewal
1965	Balenzano	George Phalen	—	—	—	—
1966	Bonjour Hanover	Stanley Dancer	—	—	2:02 1/5	Stakes record
1967	Meadow Elva	John Hanover	Haughton Trust	Haughton Trust	2:01 3/5	—
1968	Quickie Hanover	Clint Hodgins	—	Louis & Mildred Resnick	2:03 3/5	—
1969	Scotch Jewel	Glen Garnsey	—	Castleton Farms	2:07 1/5	—
1970	Timely News	Buddy Gilmour	Stanley Dancer	—	2:03 1/5	—
1971	Overdrawn	Del Cameron	Warren Cameron	Max J. Fischer & Edmund M. Drefuss	2:02.3	—
1972	Pammy Lobell	Billy Haughton	Billy Haughton	Lana & Jack Rosenfeld	2:01 1/5	—
1973	Armbro Norma	Billy Haughton	—	—	2:04.3	—
1974	Joannas Time	Ed Lohmeyer Jr.	—	—	2:01	—
1975	Native Amber	William Gilmour	—	—	2:01.4	—
1976	Bonjour Karey	Real Cormier	—	—	2:01.3	—
1977	Luannes Jewel	Merritt Dokey	Billy Haughton	—	—	—
1978	Passing Glance	George Sholty	—	—	1:59.4	—
1979	Roses Are Red	Jack Kopas	—	—	—	—
1980	Shy Dawn	Lucien Fontaine	—	—	2:00 4/5	—
1981	Fan Hanover	Glen Garnsey	Glen Garnsey	J. Glen Brown	1:59 1/5	—
1982	Roses Are Red	Jack Kopas	—	—	—	—
1983	Sudden Urge	Michel Lachance	Vinny Aurigemma	—	1:58 2/5	Stakes record
1984	My Melissa	Jerry Silverman	—	—	1:58	Stakes record
1985	Semalu D'amour	Benoit Cote	—	Ferme Semaldeux	1:58.2	—
1986	Musical Hanover / Sarcastick	John Simpson Jr. / Ray Remmen	—	—	1:59	—
2012	Blackjack Princess	Mark MacDonald	—	—	—	—
2013	Scandalous Hanover	David Miller	—	—	1:51	—
2014	Also Encouraging	—	—	—	1:52	—
2015	Stacia Hanover	Scott Zeron	Steve Elliott	David Van Dusen & Michael Cimaglio	1:49.2	Stakes record
2016	Darlinonthebeach	David Miller	Nancy Johansson	White Birch Farm	1:49.1	Stakes record
2017	Blazin Britches	David Miller	Brian Brown	—	1:48.4	—
2018	Youaremycandygirl	Yannick Gingras	Ron Burke	Bill Donovan	1:48.2	Stakes record
2019	Tall Drink Hanover	Andy McCarthy	Tony Alagna	Alagna Racing LLC, Marvin Katz, & Riverview Racing LLC	1:48	—
2020	Reflect With Me	Andy McCarthy	Tony Alagna	Brittany Farms LLC & Brad Grant	1:48.3	—
2021	Grace Hill	Andy McCarthy	Richard 'Nifty' Norman	Tom Hill	—	—
2022	Max Contract	Andy Miller	—	Steve Heimbecker, Andy Miller Stable Inc, & Jean Goehlen	—	—
2023	Sylvia Hanover	Bob McClure	Shawn & Mark Steacy	Hudson Standardbred Stable Inc.	1:48.3	—
2024	Rocket Deo	Andrew Mccarthy	Brett Pelling	John Fielding & Morrison Racing Stables	1:49	—
2025	Miki and Minnie	Chris Ryder	Chris Ryder	—	1:48 3/5	—

== See also ==
- Cane Pace
