= David Miller (harness racing) =

Harness racing driver

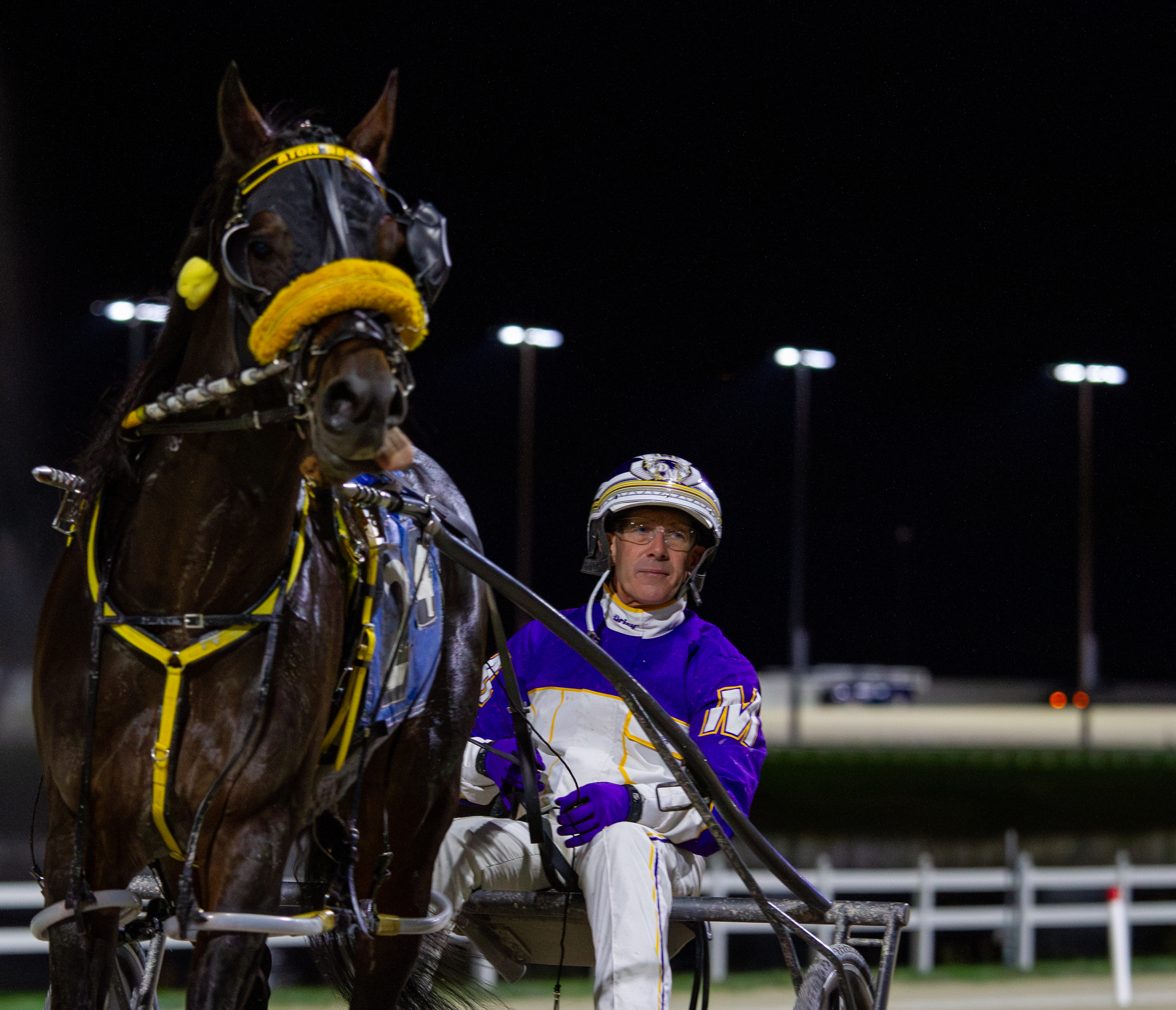
- Miller at Harrah's Hoosier Park in 2023

Personal information
- Nicknames: 'The Buckeye', 'Purple Jesus'
- Born: December 10, 1964 (age 61) Columbus, Ohio, United States
- Occupation: Harness racing driver

Horse racing career
- Sport: Horse racing
- Career wins: 14,351 (as of 2024)

Racing awards
- Dan Patch Driver of the Year Award (2003, 2015, 2016); Harness Tracks of America Driver of the Year (2015, 2016)

Honours
- U.S. Harness Racing Hall of Fame (2013)

Significant horses
- Always B Miki, Magician, No Pan Intended, Kadabra, Perfect Sting, Test Of Faith
- Updated on May 27, 2024

David Miller (born December 10, 1964) is an American harness racing driver. Miller is North America's all-time leader in driving earnings and was elected to the Harness Racing Museum & Hall of Fame in 2014.

== Career ==
David Miller was born December 10, 1964, in Columbus, Ohio. He grew up in Reynoldsburg, Ohio, in a harness racing family - his father, grandfather, uncle, nephew and cousin were all drivers. Miller saw his first Little Brown Jug when he was 12 years old.

Miller guided No Pan Intended to the Pacing Triple Crown in 2003. He has won a number of Triple Crown races and Breeders Crown trophies. Miller is a five-time winner of the Little Brown Jug and one of only two drivers (Billy Haughton in 1974) to capture both the Jug and the Jugette in the same year. He has won every individual Breeders Crown event.

On May 3, 2014, at the Meadowlands, Miller reached the 11,000 career victory milestone, becoming only the 8th North American driver to do so.

During 2014, Miller also made his first appearance at Solvalla Racetrack in Stockholm, Sweden, in an elimination for the Elitloppet with world champion trotter Uncle Peter.

In 2023, Miller reached 14,000 career wins.

In 2026, Miller became the all-time leader in earnings for a driver, passing John Campbell. Six days later, he became the first driver to reach $300 million in earnings.

== List of notable victories ==
Year	Race	Horse	Trainer
1999	(United States) Nat Ray Trot	Magician	Earl Cruise
2000	(United States) Arthur J. Cutler Memorial	Magician	Earl Cruise
2000	(Canada) Maple Leaf Trot	Magician	Earl Cruise
2000	(United States) Breeders Crown Open Trot	Magician	Earl Cruise
2001	(United States) Arthur J. Cutler Memorial	Magician	Earl Cruise
2001	(United States) Cane Pace	Four Starzzz Shark	Edward Hart
2002	(United States) Messenger Stakes	Allamerican Ingot	Robert McIntosh
2002	(Canada) Canadian Trotting Classic	Kadabra	Jimmy Takter
2002	(Canada) Breeders Crown 3YO Colt & Gelding Trot	Kadabra	Jimmy Takter
2003	(United States) Arthur J. Cutler Memorial	Kadabra	Jimmy Takter
2003	(United States) Cane Pace	No Pan Intended	Ivan Sugg
2003	(United States) Messenger Stakes	No Pan Intended	Ivan Sugg
2003	(United States) Little Brown Jug	No Pan Intended	Ivan Sugg
2004	(Canada) Breeders Crown 2YO Colt & Gelding Trot	Ken Warkentin	Jimmy Takter
2004	(United States) Breeders Crown Open Mare Pace	Always Cam	Bill Zendt
2005	(United States) Messenger Stakes	Gryffindor	Brendan Johnson
2006	(Canada) Breeders Crown 3YO Filly Trot	Susie's Magic	Anthony O'Sullivan
2008	(United States) Adios Pace	Shadow Play	Mark Ford
2008	(United States) Little Brown Jug	Shadow Play	Ian Moore
2008	(United States) Breeders Crown 2YO Filly Pace	Fox Valley Topaz	Ken Rucker
2008	(Canada) Breeders Crown 3YO Filly Pace	A And G`sconfusion	Casie Coleman
2009	(United States) Merrie Annabelle	Poof She's Gone	Richard Norman
2010	(United States) Yonkers Trot	On The Tab	Jimmy Takter
2010	(United States) Breeders Crown Open Pace	Won The West	Ron Burke
2011	(United States) Kentucky Futurity	Manofmanymissions	Erv Miller
2011	(United States) Yonkers Trot	Leader Of The Gang	Jimmy Takter
2011	(United States) Little Brown Jug	Big Bad John	Ron Potter
2012	(United States) Merrie Annabelle	To Dream On	Jimmy Takter
2012	(Canada) Breeders Crown Open Pace	Bettor Sweet	Thomas Cancelliere
2013	(United States) Earl Beal Jr. Memorial	Corky	Jimmy Takter
2013	(United States) Breeders Crown 2YO Filly Pace	Uffizi Hanover	Jimmy Takter
2013	(United States) Breeders Crown Open Mare Pace	Shelliscape	Pj Fraley
2014	(United States) Adios Pace	McWicked	Casie Coleman
2015	(United States) Jim Doherty Memorial	Broadway Donna	Jim Campbell
2015	(United States) Cane Pace	Dealt A Winner	Mark Silva
2015	(Canada) Breeders Crown 3YO Colt & Gelding Trot	The Bank	Jimmy Takter
2015	(Canada) Breeders Crown 3YO Filly Pace	Divine Caroline	Joe Holloway
2015	(Canada) Breeders Crown Open Mare Trot	D'One	Roger Walmann
2015	(Canada) Breeders Crown Open Mare Pace	Color's A Virgin	Brian Brown
2015	(Canada) Breeders Crown Open Pace	Always B Miki	Jimmy Takter
2016	(United States) Peter Haughton Memorial	What The Hill	Ron Burke
2016	(United States) Ben Franklin Free-For-All Pace	Always B Miki	Jimmy Takter
2016	(United States) Little Brown Jug	Betting Line	Casie Coleman
2016	(Canada) Gold Cup Invitational Pace	Always B Miki	Jimmy Takter
2016	(Canada) North America Cup	Betting Line	Casie Coleman
2016	(United States) Breeders Crown 3YO Filly Trot	Broadway Donna	Jim Campbell
2016	(United States) Breeders Crown Open Pace	Always B Miki	Jimmy Takter
2016	(United States) TVG Free For All Pace	Always B Miki	Jimmy Takter
2017	(United States) Adios Pace	Fear the Dragon	Brian Brown
2017	(Canada) North America Cup	Fear the Dragon	Brian Brown
2017	(Canada) Breeders Crown 3YO Colt & Gelding Trot	What The Hill	Ron Burke
2018	(United States) Meadowlands Pace	Courtly Choice	Blake MacIntosh
2018	(Canada) Metro Pace	Stag Party	Casie Coleman
2018	(United States) Little Brown Jug	Courtly Choice	Blake MacIntosh
2019	(United States) John Cashman Memorial	Crystal Fashion	Jim Campbell
2019	(United States) Peter Haughton Memorial	Real Cool Sam	Jim Campbell
2019	(Canada) Breeders Crown 3YO Colt & Gelding Trot	Gimpanzee	Marcus Melander
2020	(United States) Breeders Crown 2YO Filly Trot	Lady Chaos	Linda Toscano
2020	(United States) Breeders Crown 2YO Colt & Gelding Trot (Note: Dead heat.)	Perfect Sting	Joe Holloway
2020	(United States) Breeders Crown Open Pace	Century Farroh	Dr. Ian Moore
2021	(Canada) Armbro Flight Stakes	When Dovescry	Brett Pelling
2021	(United States) Hambletonian Maturity	Beads	Per Engblom
2021	(United States) Jim Doherty Memorial	Venerable	Richard "Nifty" Norman
2021	(Canada) Mohawk Million	Venerable	Richard "Nifty" Norman
2021	(United States) Breeders Crown 3YO Filly Pace	Test Of Faith	Brett Pelling
2021	(United States) Breeders Crown 3YO Colt & Gelding Pace	Perfect Sting	Joe Holloway
2022	(United States) Dayton Oaks Derby	When Dovescry	Brett Pelling
2022	(United States) Breeders Crown 2YO Colt & Gelding Pace	Ammo	Joe Holloway
2023	(United States) Peter Haughton Memorial	T C I	Ron Burke
2023	(Canada) Mohawk Million	T C I	Ron Burke
