= Yannick Gingras =

Canadian Haynes racing driver (born 1979)

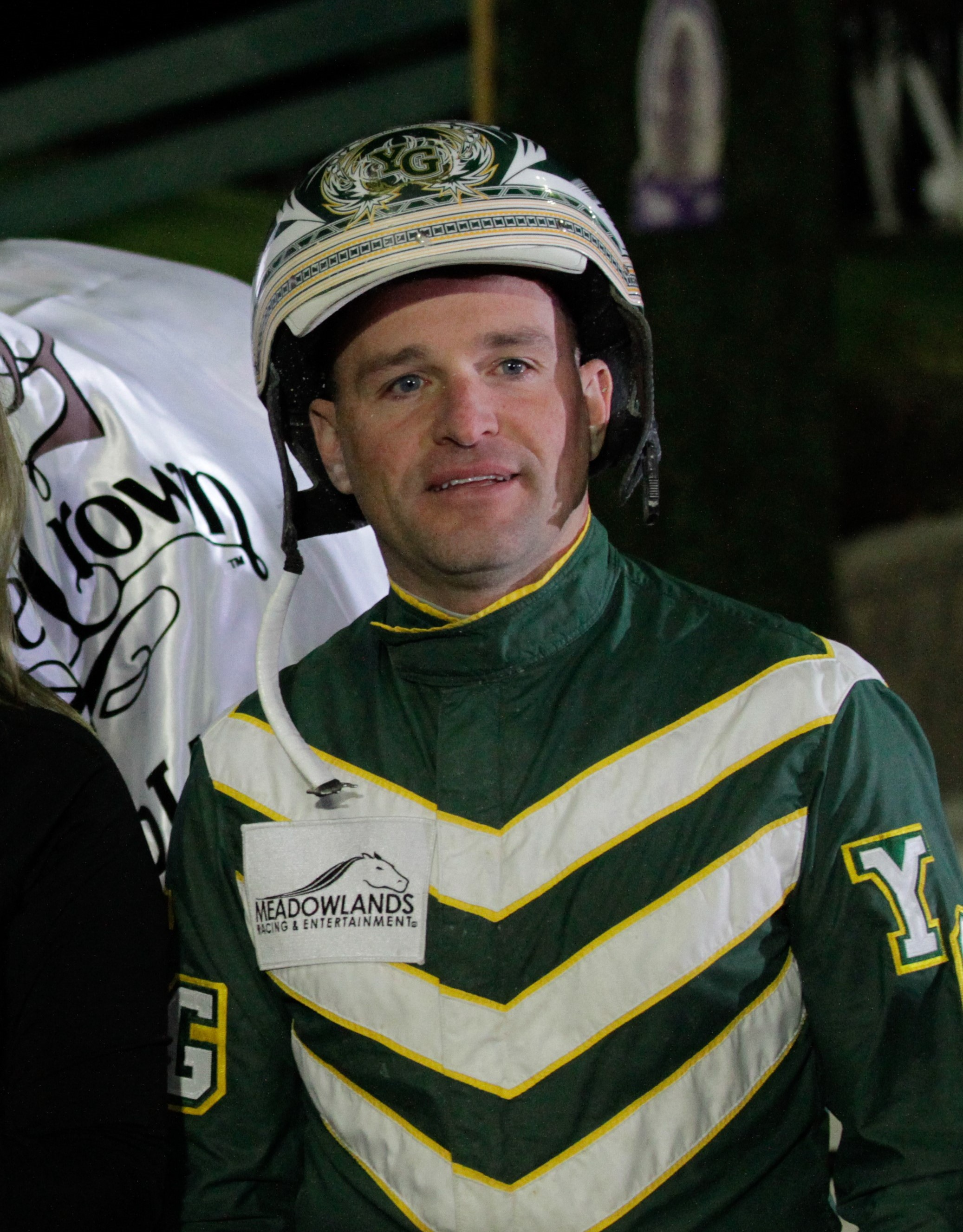
- Gingras in 2023

Personal information
- Nickname: "The Green Hornet"
- Born: August 4, 1979 (age 47) Greenfield Park, Quebec, Canada

Horse racing career
- Sport: Horse racing
- Career wins: 8,934 (as of May 27, 2024)

Major racing wins
- Fan Hanover Stakes (2006); Armbro Flight Stakes (2007, 2013, 2016); Milton Stakes (2008); Gold Cup Invitational Pace (2010); Governor's Cup Stakes (2011); Canadian Pacing Derby (2012); Meadowlands Pace (2012, 2020, 2022); Simcoe Stakes (2012); Adios Pace (2013); Glen Garnsey Memorial Pace (2013); Peter Haughton Memorial Trot (2013, 2015); TVG Free For All Pace (2013); William Wellwood Memorial Stakes (2013, 2014, 2015); Canadian Trotting Classic (2014, 2015, 2023); Hambletonian Oaks (2014, 2015, 2016, 2017, 2018, 2020); She's A Great Lady Stakes (2014); Three Diamonds Stakes (2014); Elegantimage Stakes (2015); Confederation Cup Pace (2016, 2018, 2024); Roses Are Red Stakes (2016); Prix d'Été (2016) Breeders Crown wins: Breeders Crown 2YO Filly Trot (2012, 2014, 2015, 2016, 2017); Breeders Crown 2YO Colt & Gelding Trot (2013, 2014, 2015); Breeders Crown 2YO Filly Pace (2017, 2018); Breeders Crown 2YO Colt & Gelding Pace (2012, 2019); Breeders Crown 3YO Filly Trot (2007, 2012, 2017); Breeders Crown 3YO Colt & Gelding Trot (2014); Breeders Crown 3YO Filly Pace (2014, 2019, 2020); Breeders Crown Open Mare Trot (2013, 2016); Breeders Crown Open Trot (2017); Breeders Crown Open Mare Pace (2016); Breeders Crown Open Pace (2013, 2023) U.S. Pacing Triple Crown wins: Cane Pace (2011, 2014, 2020, 2022); Little Brown Jug (2014, 2017, 2021); Messenger Stakes (2015) U.S. Trotting Triple Crown wins: Kentucky Futurity (2015); Yonkers Trot (2021); Hambletonian Stakes (2024)

Racing awards
- Dan Patch Rising Star Award (2003); Dan Patch Driver of the Year Award (2014, 2017); Leading Driver in wins at Meadowlands (2012, 2013, 2014, 2015, 2018, 2022); North American Leading Driver by earnings (2014, 2015, 2016, 2017, 2023)

Significant horses
- A Rocknroll Dance, Father Patrick, Foiled Again, Jk Shesalady, Mission Brief, Tall Dark Stranger, Manchego, Hannelore Hanover, Atlanta
- Updated on May 27, 2024

Yannick Gingras (born August 4, 1979) is a Canadian harness racing driver. He is statistically one of the top drivers of all time with more than 8,000 wins and $230 million in earnings. He was inducted into the Harness Racing Hall of Fame in 2022.

Gingras has won 24 Breeders Crown trophies, the sixth-most in history. As of May 2024, he is fourth on the all-time career earnings list. His six Hambletonian Oaks wins is a stakes record.

== Career ==
Gingras drove in his native Canada until 2001 before moving to Yonkers Raceway in New York. He was immediately successful, winning that fall's driving title. In 2003, he won 426 races to earn the Dan Patch Rising Star Award. He relocated to Meadowlands Racetrack in 2004, which he continues to maintain as his home base.

In 2014, Yannick Gingras was voted American harness racing's Dan Patch Driver of the Year Award, and led all drivers in North America in purse money won in 2014 and 2015. In June 2016 he earned the 6,000th win of his career at Pocono Downs and in August, the driver and trainer combination of Gingras and Hall of Fame inductee Jimmy Takter set a record when they won the Hambletonian Oaks together for the third consecutive year. Gingras was named Driver of the Year at the Dan Patch Awards for the second time in 2017.

From 2008 to 2016, Gingras was the main driver of Foiled Again, the highest-earning horse in harness racing history. He drove him in 192 of the horse's 331 lifetime starts, including wins in the Breeders Crown Open Pace, Canadian Pacing Derby, and TVG Free For All Pace.

Gingras was the regular driver of Atlanta, widely regarded as one of the greatest trotting mares ever, from 2019 to 2022. He drove her to her world record-setting time of 1:49 at The Red Mile in 2021 and to wins against male opponents in the Maple Leaf Trot and Graduate Series Final, among others.

In 2024, Gingras won the Hambletonian for the first time, driving favourite Karl to victory.

On August 16, 2024, Gingras won 10 of 14 races on the card at Harrah's Philadelphia, tying that track's record for driver wins in one race card.

== Personal life ==
Gingras was born in Greenfield Park, Quebec, grew up in Sorel, Quebec, and resides in Allentown, New Jersey. He is married to Vicki Gingras and has a son and two daughters.
