= George Sholty =

American harness racing driver (1932–2000)

Personal information
- Born: George Franklin Sholty; November 2, 1932 Logansport, Indiana, U.S.
- Died: December 14, 2000 (aged 68) Lexington, Kentucky, U.S.
- Occupations: Harness racing driver; horse trainer
- Years active: 1950–1998

Horse racing career
- Sport: Harness racing
- Career winnings: $20,777,666
- Career wins: 2,934

Major racing wins
- American Trotting Classic (1961); Yonkers Trot (1966); Messenger Stakes (1966); Little Brown Jug (1966), 1992); Little Brown Jugette (1978, 1986); Pacing Triple Crown (1966); Yonkers Trot (1966); Adios Pace (1968); Prix d'Été (1970); Old Oaken Bucket (1972); Dexter Cup (1972); Bronx Filly Pace (1978); Colonial Trot (1978); Meadowlands Pace (1979); Hambletonian Stakes (1979); Walnut Hall Cup (1983); Breeders Crown 2YO Filly Trot (1984); Breeders Crown 3YO Filly Trot (1987); Hambletonian Oaks (1987); Breeders Crown Open Mare Trot (1988)

Honors
- United States Harness Racing Hall of Fame (1985)

Significant horses
- Romeo Hanover

George Sholty (November 2, 1932 – December 14, 2000) was an American harness racing driver and horse trainer.

== Early life and education ==
George Franklin Sholty was born in Logansport, Indiana, United States, in 1932.

He was the son of Ruth Packard and George Sholty. He grew up in a harness racing family, with his grandfather, father, and great-uncle all active in the sport.

He stood 5 feet 2 inches high and played basketball in his youth as a guard and the co-captain of the county champion team. He graduated from Washington Township High School in Logansport.

== Career ==
His uncle gifted him a trotter named George Jr. in 1950 when he was 17. He began racing at Logansport, with his first success coming in 1951. That year at 18 years old, he won his first harness race with George Jr. at the Clinton County Fairgrounds track in Frankfort, Indiana.

During his first seven years as a reinsman, Sholty recorded only 26 victories and earned less than $16,000 in purses. He worked under Gene Sears as second trainer and travelled with the stable across the regional racing circuit.

In the summer of 1957, while working his second season under Tommy Winn, Sholty earned his first chance to compete at a major track. Driving for Tommy Winn and as a catch-driver, he recorded 40 victories. Entering the 1958 season, he established his own stable and led all drivers nationally with a .383 winning percentage.

After competing in Indiana, he eventually earned a role as second trainer in Chicago. Impressed with Sholty's handling, retired investor Faye Ross funded the $20,000 purchase of Air Record and gave Sholty a 50 percent share as incentive. He drove the mare from 1960 through 1962, winning $265,439.

While racing on the East Coast of the United States in the 1960s, he established himself as a top reinsman with repeated driving titles at Yonkers Raceway and Roosevelt Raceway. In December 1965, he recorded his 1,000th career win. During his 1966 season with Romeo Hanover, Sholty became the third driver to complete the Pacing Triple Crown. By the end of that year, he had become the seventh driver ever to earn over $4 million in career purses.

He later trained and drove Rivaltime, a two-year-old pacer purchased for $20,000 as a yearling. The colt raced for Warrior Stable and Septimus Farm and was partly owned by Wilt Chamberlain. In May 1964, a 2:05 victory at Liberty Bell Park Racetrack brought Sholty and Chamberlain together in the winner's circle. At the Old Glory Standardbred Sales at Yonkers Raceway in October 1967, he purchased Rivaltime, then five years old, for $40,000.

He campaigned Florida Pro for Al Lippe of Great Neck as both trainer and regular driver, winning nine of the colt's 13 starts at age two. In the 1978 Hambletonian Stakes, he guided Florida Pro to victory in the second heat against Speedy Somolli, but was defeated in the third and deciding heat.

He won the 54th Hambletonian Stakes in straight heats with Legend Hanover in 1979. It was his first Hambletonian victory.

He joined Castleton Farm in 1984 as its contract trainer and driver. Sholty trained and drove Conifer who won the Breeders Crown 2-year-old filly trot in 1984. He also trained and piloted Gentle Stroke to a heat win in the 1984 Hambletonian Stakes.

On July 29, 1985, he guided Express Ride to win his first million-dollar race, the Peter Haughton Memorial. Sholty prepared Express Ride for the 1985 Breeders Crown at The Meadowlands in his final major race as Castleton Farm's contract trainer, while John Campbell served as driver. By October 1985, he had resigned from Castleton Farm and was replaced by Dan Shetler.

While working for the Armstrong Brothers, he drove and trained Armbro Fling, a daughter of Speedy Crown. He guided the trotter to victory in the 1987 Breeders Crown Three-Year-Old Filly Trot.

He captured his second win in the Little Brown Jug as trainer of Fake Left on September 24, 1992.

The veteran driver-trainer retired in 1998 at the age of 66 after compiling 2,934 career wins and over $20 million in purses.

== Death ==
George Sholty died on December 14, 2000, in Lexington, Kentucky, United States, at 68.

== Legacy ==
Sholty became the 34th inductee to the United States Harness Racing Hall of Fame in 1985.
