= Breeders Crown 3YO Colt & Gelding Trot =

- Location: North America
- Inaugurated: 1984 (42 years ago)
- Race type: Harness race for Standardbred trotters

Race information
- Distance: 1 mile (1,609 metres or 8 furlongs)
- Surface: Dirt
- Qualification: 3-year-olds
- Purse: $822,000 (2025)

The Breeders 3yo Colt & Gelding Trot is a harness racing event for three-year-old Standardbred maletrotters. It is one part of an annual Breeders Crown series of twelve races for both Standardbred trotters and pacers. First run in 1985, it is contested over a distance of one mile. Race organizers have awarded the event to various racetracks across North America.

== Historical race events ==
In 2010, Pocono Downs became the first venue to host all 12 events on a single night.

== North American locations ==
- Woodbine Racetrack (Wdb) Ontario (10)
- Meadowlands Racetrack (Mxx) New Jersey (8)
- Pompano Park (Ppk) Florida (7)
- Mohawk Raceway (Moh) Ontario (7)
- Harrah's Hoosier Park (HoP) Indiana (3)
- Pocono Downs (Pcd) Pennsylvania (3)
- Colonial Downs (Cln) Virginia (1)
- Garden State Park (Gsp) New Jersey (1)
- The Meadows Racetrack (Mea) Pennsylvania (1)
- Vernon Downs (Vdx) New York (1)

== Records ==
Most wins by a driver

- 6 – Brian Sears (2004, 2005, 2007, 2009, 2010, 2018)

Most wins by a trainer

- 7 – Jimmy Takter (1997, 2002, 2008, 2014, 2015, 2016, 2018)

Stakes record

- 1:50 1/5 – Meshuggah (2025)

== Winners of the Breeders Crown 3YO Colt & Gelding Trot ==
Year	Winner	Driver	Trainer	Owner	Time	Purse	Track
2025	Meshuggah	Scott Zeron	Marcus Melander	Courant Inc.	1:50 1/5	$822,000	Moh
2024	Sig Sauer	Andrew McCarthy	Noel Daley	Patricia Stable, Joe Sbrocco & JAF Racing, Allister Stables LLC, Caviart Farms	1:50 4/5	$600,000	Mxx
2023	Tactical Approach	Scott Zeron	Nancy Takter	Robert Leblanc, John Fielding, Joe Sbrocco, JAF Racing	1:51 2/5	$672,000	HoP
2022	King Of The North	Mark MacDonald	Ray Schnittker	Schnittker Ward, Arden Homestead, Nolamura Racing, Steve Arnold	1:50 3/5	$600,000	Moh
2021	Jujubee	Andrew McCarthy	Greg Wright Jr.	Jon W. Erdner	1:51 2/5	$650,000	Mxx
2020	Amigo Volo	Dexter Dunn	Richard "Nifty" Norman	Pinske Stables, David J. Miller	1:53 0/0	$500,000	HoP
2019	Gimpanzee	David Miller	Marcus Melander	Courant Inc., SRF Stable	1:52 3/5	$500,000	Moh
2018	Tactical Landing	Brian Sears	Jimmy Takter	Andrea Lea Racing Stable, The Tactical Landing Stable	1:52 1/5	$550,000	Pcd
2017	What The Hill	David Miller	Ron Burke	Burke Racing Stable, J&T Silva-Purnel & Libby, Our Horse Cents Stables, Deo Volente	1:52 3/5	$527,500	HoP
2016	Bar Hopping	Tim Tetrick	Jimmy Takter	Christina Takter, Hatfield Stables, Marvin Katz	1:51 4/5	$500,000	Mxx
2015	The Bank	David Miller	Jimmy Takter	Christina Takter, Goran Falk, Goran Anderberg	1:54 3/5	$500,000	Wdb
2014	Father Patrick	Yannick Gingras	Jimmy Takter	Father Patrick Stable	1:51 4/5	$500,000	Mxx
2013	Spider Blue Chip	Ronald Pierce	Charles Sylvester	David McDuffee & Melvin Hartman	1:53 3/5	$500,000	Pcd
2012	Intimate	Ronald Pierce	Luc Blais	Luc Blais & Judith Farrow	1:52 4/5	$555,000	Wdb
2011	Chapter Seven	Jeff Gregory	Linda Toscano	Richard Gutnick, Southwind Farm, Gary Cocco, Jerry Silva	1:53 0/0	$610,000	Wdb
2010	Break The Bank	Brian Sears	Trond Smedshammer	Robert J. Key	1:52 2/5	$500,000	Pcd
2009	Muscle Hill	Brian Sears	Greg Peck	Silva, TLP Stb., Southwind Farm, Muscle Hill Stb.	1:54 1/5	$600,000	Wdb
2008	In Focus	Dave Palone	Jimmy Takter	Christina Takter, John & Jim Fielding	1:53 4/5	$500,000	Mxx
2007	Arch Madness	Brian Sears	Trond Smedshammer	Marc Goldberg & Willow Pond LLC	1:52 4/5	$610,000	Mxx
2006	Majestic Son	Trevor Ritchie	Mark Steacy	Majestic Son Stable	1:54 2/5	$500,000	Wdb
2005	Strong Yankee	Brian Sears	Trond Smedshammer	Strong Yankee Stable	1:53 4/5	$610,000	Mxx
2004	Yankee Slide	Brian Sears	Steve Elliott	Joseph Pennacchio	1:54 4/5	$550,000	Wdb
2003	Mr. Muscleman	Ronald Pierce	Noel Daley	Adam H. Victor	1:54 2/5	$635,000	Mxx
2002	Kadabra	David Miller	Jimmy Takter	Abra Kadabra Stable	1:54 1/5	$567,500	Wdb
2001	Liberty Balance	Randy Waples	Pat Hunt	Thomas & Elizabeth Rankin	1:55 0/0	$630,000	Wdb
2000	Fast Photo	Michel Lachance	Don Swick	Royal Wire Products	1:55 4/5	$490,000	Moh
1999	CR Renegade	Rod Allen	Carl Allen	Carl & Rod Allen Stable	1:54 2/5	$400,000	Moh
1998	Muscles Yankee	John Campbell	Charles Sylvester	Perretti Farms, Irving G. Liverman, David French	1:53 0/0	$530,000	Cln
1997	Malabar Man	Malvern Burroughs	Jimmy Takter	Malvern Burroughs	1:55 2/5	$440,000	Moh
1996	Running Sea	Wally Hennessey	Charles Sylvester	DDH Racing Stables	1:55 0/0	$425,000	Vdx
1995	Abundance	Bill O'Donnell	John Ducharme	John & Richard Ducharme	1:58 0/0	$400,000	Wdb
1994	Incredible Abe	Italo Tamborrino	Charles Sylvester	Morris Feldman & Ralph DelPriore	1:54 1/5	$400,000	Gsp
1993	Pine Chip	John Campbell	Charles Sylvester	C. Sylvester, G. Donahue, N. Goldman, Guida Racing	1:54 2/5	$300,000	Ppk
1992	Baltic Striker	Michel Lachance	Ron Gurfein	Wilshire Racing Stable (lessee)	1:55 4/5	$300,000	Ppk
1991	Giant Victory	Ronald Pierce	Per Eriksson	Jacquie & Ted Gewertz & Robins Racing	1:56 0/0	$365,406	Ppk
1990	Embassy Lobell	Michel Lachance	Jerry Riordan	LPG Standardbred Associates	1:56 4/5	$396,933	Ppk
1989	Esquire Spur	Richard Stillings	Richard Stillings	Roy Davis, Edwin Beachler, John Townsend	1:56 1/5	$429,701	Ppk
1988	Firm Tribute	Mark O'Mara	Mark O'Mara	Karl Goesta Goestasson	1:55 3/5	$393,506	Mea
1987	Mack Lobell	John Campbell	Charles Sylvester	Fair Winds Farm & One More Time Stable	1:54 1/5	$442,662	Ppk
1986	Sugarcane Hanover	Ron Waples	James W. Simpson	John F. Simpson Sr.	1:57 1/5	$460,350	Gsp
1985	Prakas	John Campbell	Per Eriksson	Enggren, Vizzi, MacKenzie	1:57 1/5	$455,821	Moh
1984	Baltic Speed	Jan Nordin	Sören Nordin	Baltic Farm	1:57 2/5	$558,000	Ppk
