= Breeders Crown Open Mare Trot =

- Class: Grade 1
- Location: North America
- Inaugurated: 1986
- Race type: Harness race for Standardbred trotters

Race information
- Distance: 1 mile (1,609 metres or 8 furlongs)
- Surface: Dirt
- Qualification: 3-year-olds-and-up
- Purse: $400,000 (2025)

The Breeders Crown Open Mare Trot is a Grade 1 harness racing event for three-year-old and older Standardbred mare trotters. It is one part of the Breeders Crown annual series of twelve races for both Standardbred trotters and pacers. First run in 1986, it is contested over a distance of one mile. Race organizers have awarded the event to various racetracks across North America.

== Historical race events ==
In 1989, Grades Singing won a record third Open Mare Trot. An international trotting star in top level races, in 1987 she won Sweden's Olympiatravet, Finland's Finlandia-Ajo, and Italy's Gran Premio Lotteria. The following year she returned to Europe where she claimed victory for a second time in Italy's 1988 Gran Premio Lotteria plus that country's Gran Premio delle Nazioni.

In 1990, Peace Corps won her first of two Open Mare Trots, doing it in World Record time. Her 1992 win in the Open Mare Trot made her the only horse in history to win four Breeders Crown races.

From 1996 through 2003 the Open Mare Trot was not run and female horses were left to compete against their male counterparts in the Breeders Crown Open Trot.

Five horses have won the race twice: Peace Corps (1990, 1992), Mystical Sunshine (2006, 2007), Buck I St. Pat (2009, 2010), Emoticon Hanover (2017, 2018), and Manchego (2019, 2020).

== North American locations ==
- Mohawk Raceway (Moh) Ontario (8)
- Meadowlands Racetrack (Mxx) New Jersey (7)
- Harrah's Hooser Park (HoP) Indiana (3)
- Woodbine Racetrack (Wdb) Ontario (3)
- Pocono Downs (Pcd) Pennsylvania (3)
- Batavia Downs (Btv) New York (1)
- Blue Bonnets Raceway (Bbr) Quebec (1)
- Delaware County Fair Racetrack (Dela) Ohio (1)
- Freehold Raceway (Fhl) New Jersey (1)
- Northfield Park (Nfl) Ohio (1)
- Pompano Park (Ppk) Florida (1)
- Scioto Downs (Scd) Ohio (1)
- The Meadows Racetrack (Mea) Pennsylvania (1)

== Records ==
Most wins by a horse

- 3 – Grades Singing (1986, 1987, 1989)

Most wins by a driver

- 4 – Dexter Dunn (2019, 2020, 2022, 2023)

Most wins by a trainer

- 4 – Ake Svanstedt (2021, 2023, 2024, 2025)

Stakes record

- 1:50 2/5 – Warrawee Michelle (2025)

== Winners of the Breeders Crown Open Mare Trot ==
Year	Winner	Age	Driver	Trainer	Owner	Time	Purse	Track
2025	Warrawee Michelle	4	Ake Svanstedt	Ake Svanstedt	Ake Svanstedt Inc., Santandrea, Young Guns	1:50 2/5	$400,000	Moh
2024	Call Me Goo	4	Ake Svanstedt	Ake Svanstedt	Graham Grace Stables, Ake Svanstedt Stables	1:50 4/5	$496,000	Mxx
2023	Jiggy Jog S	4	Dexter Dunn	Ake Svanstedt	Jorgen Sparredal Inc.	1:51 1/5	$400,000	HoP
2022	Bella Bellini	4	Dexter Dunn	Richard "Nifty" Norman	David McDuffee	1:51 1/5	$350,000	Moh
2021	Felicityshagwell S	6	Ake Svanstedt	Ake Svanstedt	Knutsson Trotting Inc.	1:52 2/5	$300,000	Mxx
2020	Manchego	5	Dexter Dunn	Nancy Takter	Brittany Farms	1:52 0/0	$300,000	HoP
2019	Manchego	4	Dexter Dunn	Nancy Takter	Brittany Farms	1:51 0/0	$300,000	Moh
2018	Emoticon Hanover	5	Daniel Dube	Luc Blais	Determination	1:54 1/5	$300,000	Pcd
2017	Emoticon Hanover	4	Daniel Dube	Luc Blais	Determination	1:53 4/5	$250,000	HoP
2016	Hannelore Hanover	4	Yannick Gingras	Ron Burke	Burke Racing Stable LLC, Weaver Bruscemi LLC, Frank Baldachino	1:53 3/5	$250,000	Mxx
2015	D'One	5	David Miller	Roger Walmann	Stall Kenny 23	1:54 2/5	$250,000	Wdb
2014	Bee A Magician	4	Brian Sears	Richard "Nifty" Norman	Mel Hartman, Herb Liverman, Dave McDuffee	1:51 4/5	$250,000	Mxx
2013	Maven	4	Yannick Gingras	Jonas Czernyson	William J. Donovan	1:52 3/5	$250,000	Pcd
2012	Tamla Celeber	5	Brian Sears	Roger Walmann	Courant AB	1:55 2/5	$250,000	Wdb
2011	Frenchfrysnvinegar	6	Jody Jamieson	Jeffrey Gillis	David S. Smith	1:53 3/5	$300,000	Wdb
2010	Buck I St. Pat	7	Tim Tetrick	Ron Burke	Howard Taylor, Edwin Gold, Abraham Basen, Dr. Ron Fuller	1:52 3/5	$250,000	Pcd
2009	Buck I St. Pat	6	Tim Tetrick	Ron Burke	Howard Taylor, Edwin Gold, Abraham Basen, Dr. Ron Fuller	1:52 0/0	$250,000	Mxx
2008	Brigham Dream	4	Luc Ouellette	Nicolas Vandenplas	Reve Avec Moi	1:53 2/5	$290,500	Moh
2007	Mystical Sunshine	6	Daniel Dubé	Christopher J. Ryder	Sidney Korn & Alvin Jacobson Estate	1:54 2/5	$325,000	Moh
2006	Mystical Sunshine	5	Ronald Pierce	Christopher J. Ryder	Sidney Korn & Alvin Jacobson	1:53 3/5	$250,000	Mxx
2005	Peaceful Way	4	Trevor Ritchie	David Tingley	Stiller, Tingley, Katz, Goldband, Libfeld & Goin' My Way Stable	1:53 1/5	$250,000	Moh
2004	Armbro Affair	4	Ronald Pierce	Robert McIntosh	McIntosh Stable, CSX Stables & Kohler	1:54 1/5	$250,000	Mxx
1996 -2003	No races	-	no races	no races	no races	0:00 0/0	no races	-
1995	CR Kay Suzie	3	Rod Allen	Carl Allen	Carl & Rod Allen Stable	1:58 1/5	$300,000	Dela
1994	Armbro Keepsake	5	Stig H. Johansson	Stig H. Johansson	Armstrong Bros.	1:57 4/5	$250,000	Fhl
1993	Lifetime Dream	5	Paul MacDonell	George Elliott	George Elliott & Joseph Dunsmore	1:55 4/5	$250,000	Moh
1992	Peace Corps	5	Torbjorn Jansson	Torbjorn Jansson	Stall Pieder	1:58 0/0	$314,200	Moh
1991	Me Maggie	4	Berndt O. Lindstedt	Jan Johnson	Arden Homestead Stable	1:58 2/5	$300,000	Mea
1990	Peace Corps	4	Stig H. Johansson	Stig H. Johansson	Stall Pieder	1:54 2/5	$203,458	Ppk
1989	Grades Singing	7	Olle Goop	Olle Goop	Grades Singing Stable	1:57 3/5	$247,739	Bbr
1988	Armbro Flori	4	George Sholty	Larry Walker	Armstrong Bros.	1:59 3/5	$268,756	Btv
1987	Grades Singing	5	Olle Goop	Olle Goop	Grades Singing Stable	1:58 3/5	$228,162	Nfl
1986	Grades Singing	4	Hervé Filion	Hervé Filion	Ferme Grade	1:57 4/5	$242,290	Scd

== See also ==
- List of Breeders Crown Winners
