= TVG Free For All Pace =

The TVG Free For All Pace is a harness racing event for Standardbred pacers run as a part of the four-race TVG Free For All Championships at Meadowlands Racetrack in East Rutherford, New Jersey.

== TVG Free For All Pace winners ==
Year	Winner	Age	Driver	Trainer	Owner	Time	Purse
2016	Always B Miki	5	David Miller	Jimmy Takter	Bluewood Stable, Roll The Dice Stable (Joe Hurley), Christina Takter	1:48 2/5	$400,000
2015	Bettor's Edge	6	Matt Kakaley	Ron Burke	Burke Racing Stable, Weaver Bruscemi, M1 Stable	1:50 0/0	$400,000
2014	Sweet Lou	5	Ron Pierce	Ron Burke	Burke Racing Stable, Weaver Bruscemi, Lawrence Karr, Phillip Collura	1:48 0/0	$500,000
2013	Foiled Again	9	Yannick Gingras	Ron Burke	Burke Racing Stable, Weaver Bruscemi, Lawrence Karr, Phillip Collura	1:49 2/5	$512,000
