= Michel Lachance (harness racing) =

20th and 21st-century harness racing driver and owner

Personal information
- Born: December 16, 1950 St. Augustin, Quebec, Canada

Horse racing career
- Sport: Horse racing
- Career wins: 10,253

Major racing wins
- Confederation Cup Pace (1988, 2003); Meadowlands Pace (1988, 2003); Prix d'Été (1988, 1989); Merrie Annabelle Filly Trot (1988, 1992); Adios Pace (1989, 1996, 2006); Canadian Trotting Classic (1989); Gold Cup Invitational Pace (1989); U.S. Pacing Championship (1989, 1990, 2004); William R. Haughton Memorial Pace (1989, 1990, 1997, 2000, 2003, 2004); Hambletonian Oaks (1990); New Jersey Classic Pace (1990,1998, 1999, 2001, 2003); Dexter Cup (1991, 2002, 2004); North America Cup (1992, 1998, 2001); Tattersalls Pace (1994, 1997, 1998, 1999, 2001, 2002 (2)); Valley Victory Pace (1995); Art Rooney Pace (1996, 1997); Woodrow Wilson Pace (1996, 1999); Max Hempt Memorial Pace (1997); Milton Stakes (1997); International Stallion Stakes (1998, 1997, 2004, 2009); Canadian Pacing Derby (2000); Metro Pace (2001); Elegantimage Stakes (2002, 2005) Breeders Crown wins: Breeders Crown Open Pace (1985, 1989, 1991, 1997, 2000); Breeders Crown Open Mare Pace (1986, 1994, 2000); Breeders Crown 3YO Colt & Gelding Pace (1989, 1994, 1996, 1998); Breeders Crown 3YO Colt & Gelding Trot (1990, 1992, 2000); Breeders Crown 3YO Filly Trot (1992); Breeders Crown 2YO Filly Pace (1993, 2006); Breeders Crown 2YO Filly Trot (1995, 2001, 2006); Breeders Crown 3YO Filly Pace (1996); Breeders Crown 2YO Colt & Gelding Pace (1997, 2000, 2006); Breeders Crown 2YO Colt & Gelding Trot (2003, 2009); Breeders Crown 2YO Filly Pace (2006) U.S. Pacing Triple Crown wins: Little Brown Jug (1988, 1989, 1994, 1997, 2001); Cane Pace (1987, 1997, 1998); Messenger Stakes (1988, 1997) U.S. Trotting Triple Crown wins: Hambletonian Stakes (1994, 1996, 1999, 2003); Yonkers Trot (1991, 1992, 1996) Kentucky Futurity (1991, 2012, 2013)

Racing awards
- HTA Driver of the Year Award (1985, 1986, 1987); U.S. Harness Racing Driving Champion (1984, 1985, 1986, 1987)

Honours
- Canadian Horse Racing Hall of Fame (1993); United States Harness Racing Hall of Fame (1995); Little Brown Jug Wall of Fame (2001)

Significant horses
- Bettor's Delight, B. J. Scoot, Camluck, Continentalvictory, Goalie Jeff, Magical Mike, Matt's Scooter, Shady Character, Victory Dream, Western Dreamer, T K's Skipper
- Updated on 7 November 2016

Michel "Mike" Lachance (born December 16, 1950, in St. Augustin, Quebec) is a retired harness racing driver. Widely recognized as among the best drivers of all time, his outstanding career began in 1967 in Quebec City. At retirement, he had won 10,253 races and purses totalling $187,710,149. He has been inducted into both the United States and Canadian Harness Racing Halls of Fame.

== National Driving Championships and Triple Crown win ==
The holder of leading driver titles at major racetracks in Canada and the United States, Lachance began driving harness horses as a young boy and in 1967 began driving professionally at age seventeen in Quebec City, Quebec. He went on to win driving championships at Blue Bonnets Raceway in Montreal, Quebec. His success in Canada led to a move to the major tracks in the New York City area in 1982. In 1984 he became the first driver to win 200 races in a single year at both Roosevelt and Yonkers Raceway. In 1988 Lachance made the Meadowlands Racetrack his base. At the mecca of American harness racing he would rank in the top five drivers for fifteen straight seasons.

Lachance was the U.S. National Champion in wins for four straight years from 1984 to 1987. In 1986 he set a new North American record with 770 wins. On July 14, 1995, he set a new record for most wins on a single race card with eight. Among his many major career wins were five in the prestigious Little Brown Jug, four Hambletonian Stakes and three North America Cup races. In 1997 he won the Triple Crown of Harness Racing for Pacers with Western Dreamer, the only gelding of any breed to ever win a Triple Crown.

== Post driving career ==
Retired from driving, Lachance and his wife Micheline live on their rural farm property in Millstone Township, New Jersey. Still involved as an owner of Standardbred racers, his sons Patrick and Martin have careers in harness racing.
