= Wally Hennessey =

Canadian-American athlete

Personal information
- Born: October 4, 1956 (age 69) Charlottetown, Prince Edward Island, Canada
- Occupation: Harness racing driver

Horse racing career
- Sport: Horse racing
- Career wins: 12,000+

Major racing wins
- Walter Dale Memorial Pace (1981, 1984, 1986); Woodrow Wilson Pace (1992); Battle of Lake Erie Pace (1993); Hambletonian Oaks (1996); Matron Stakes (filly division) (1996); New York Sire Stakes Championship (1996); Nat Ray Trot (1998, 1999, 2000); Elitlopp Trot (1998); Gold Cup & Saucer Pace (2001, 2005) Breeders Crown wins: Breeders Crown 3YO Colt & Gelding Trot (1996); Breeders Crown 2YO Colt & Gelding Trot (1997); Breeders Crown 2YO Filly Trot (1997); Breeders Crown Open Trot (1998) U.S. Trotting Triple Crown wins: Kentucky Futurity (1996, 1997)

Honours
- Prince Edward Island Sports Hall of Fame (2006); United States Harness Racing Hall of Fame (2007); Canadian Horse Racing Hall of Fame (2014)

Significant horses
- Cambest, Moni Maker

Walter J. "Wally" Hennessey (born October 4, 1956) is a Hall of Fame harness racing driver. He was inducted into the Prince Edward Island Sports Hall of Fame in 2006, the United States Horse Racing Hall of Fame in 2007 and the Canadian Horse Racing Hall of Fame on August 6, 2014.

Hennessey drove his first horse to victory in 1975. On June 13, 1992, at Buffalo Raceway, Hennessey won seven New York Sire Stakes events, including a track-record six in a row. He won his 8,000th career race on February 18, 2012.

Hennessey relocated to the United States during the late 1980s and currently makes his home in Coconut Creek, Florida.

Henessey was the main driver of champion Moni Maker.
