= TVG Free For All Championships =

The TVG Free For all Championships is a set of harness races for Standardbred horses run annually since 2013 at Meadowlands Racetrack in East Rutherford, New Jersey.

As of 2016 the Championship races consist of the following:

- Free For All Mare Pace - $200,000
- Free For All Mares Trot - $200,000
- Free For All Trot - $400,000
- Free For All Pace - $400,000
