= Ron Waples =

Canadian harness racer (born 1944)

Personal information
- Born: July 21, 1944 Toronto, Ontario, Canada
- Occupations: Harness racing driver, trainer, owner

Horse racing career
- Sport: Horse racing
- Career wins: 6,900+

Major racing wins
- Maple Leaf Trot (1976, 1984, 1989, 1990, 1992); Gold Cup Invitational Pace (1978, 1980, 1986); Burlington Stakes (1982, 1983, 1984, 1993); Governor Alfred E. Driscoll Pace (1979); Meadowlands Pace (1983); Adios Pace (1983); Prix d'Été (1983); Tattersalls Pace (1983); Pilgrim Pace (1985); Glen Garnsey Memorial Pace (1988); Lawrence B. Sheppard Pace (1990); Art Rooney Pace (1989); Fan Hanover Stakes (1989); Little Brown Jugette (1991); Woodrow Wilson Pace (1991); North America Cup (1993) Breeders Crown wins: Breeders Crown 2YO Filly Trot (1986, 1989); Breeders Crown 3YO Colt & Gelding Trot (1986); Breeders Crown 3YO Filly Pace (1986); Breeders Crown Open Trot (1987, 1990, 1992); Breeders Crown 3YO Filly Trot (1991); Breeders Crown 2YO Colt & Gelding Pace (1992) U.S. Pacing Triple Crown wins: Messenger Stakes (1983); Cane Pace (1983); Little Brown Jug (1983, 1992) U.S. Trotting Triple Crown wins: Kentucky Futurity (1986, 1988); Hambletonian Stakes (1989)

Racing awards
- Harness Tracks of America Driver of the Year (1979, 1980)

Honours
- Canadian Horse Racing Hall of Fame (1986); U.S. Harness Racing Hall of Fame (1994); Little Brown Jug Wall of Fame (2006)

Significant horses
- Armbro Dallas, Delphi's Lobell, Dream Maker, Fake Left, JM Vangogh, No Sex Please, Oaklea Count, Park Avenue Joe, Presidential Ball, Ralph Hanover, Sportsmaster, Sugarcane Hanover, Village Jiffy
- Updated on October 30, 2016

Ronald W. Waples (born July 21, 1944, in Toronto, Ontario) is a Canadian harness racer. He was inducted into the Canadian Horse Racing Hall of Fame in 1986, the U.S. Harness Racing Hall of Fame in 1993, and the Little Brown Jug Wall of Fame in 2006. Among his successes in an outstanding and ongoing career he was voted Harness Tracks of America Driver of the Year for 1979 and 1980, plus he drove, trained, and co-owned the colt Ralph Hanover with which he won the Triple Crown of Harness Racing for Pacers in 1983.
