= Little Brown Jug Wall of Fame =

Little Brown Jug Wall of Fame honors those persons who have made a contribution to the success of the Little Brown Jug harness race. It is located at the Delaware County, Ohio fairgrounds at 236 Pennsylvania Avenue, Delaware, Ohio. Through the auspices of the Delaware County Fair, the new member is presented with a Wall of Fame jacket and a wall plaque at the time of the race.

Through 2023, there have been 38 individuals elected to the Wall of Fame, chosen by a panel of national and international harness racing enthusiasts.

== Little Brown Jug Wall of Fame members ==
- 1985 — Henry C. "Hank" Thomson
- 1986 — William R. "Billy" Haughton
- 1987 — Delvin G. "Del" Miller
- 1988 — John F. Simpson Sr.
- 1989 — Stanley F. Dancer
- 1990 — John G. Hayes, Sr.
- 1991 — Stanley F. Bergstein
- 1992 — Gene Riegle
- 1993 — James A. Rhodes
- 1994 — Corwin M. Nixon
- 1995 — W. D. "Tom" Thomson
- 1996 — John Campbell
- 1997 — Charlie Bowen
- 1998 — George Segal
- 1999 — H. Charles Armstrong
- 2000 — Roger Huston
- 2001 — Michel Lachance
- 2002 — Thomas Walsh, Jr.
- 2003 — William O'Donnell
- 2004 — Howard Beissinger
- 2005 — Mrs. LaVerne A. Hill
- 2006 — Ron Waples
- 2007 — Jules Siegel
- 2008 — Dr. J. Glen Brown
- 2009 — Joe M. Thomson
- 2010 — Phil Terry
- 2011 — Paul E. Spears
- 2012 — Jeff Gural
- 2013 — James W. "Jim" Simpson
- 2014 — Dr. Don "Doc" Mossbarger
- 2015 — Jim Buchy
- 2016 — William C. "Bill" Lowe
- 2017 — David Miller
- 2018 — Ron Pierce
- 2019 — Jimmy Takter
- 2021 — Mickey & Sylvia Burke
- 2022 — Richard "Dick" Stillings
- 2023 — Bob Schmitz
