= Meadowlands Pace =

Harness race

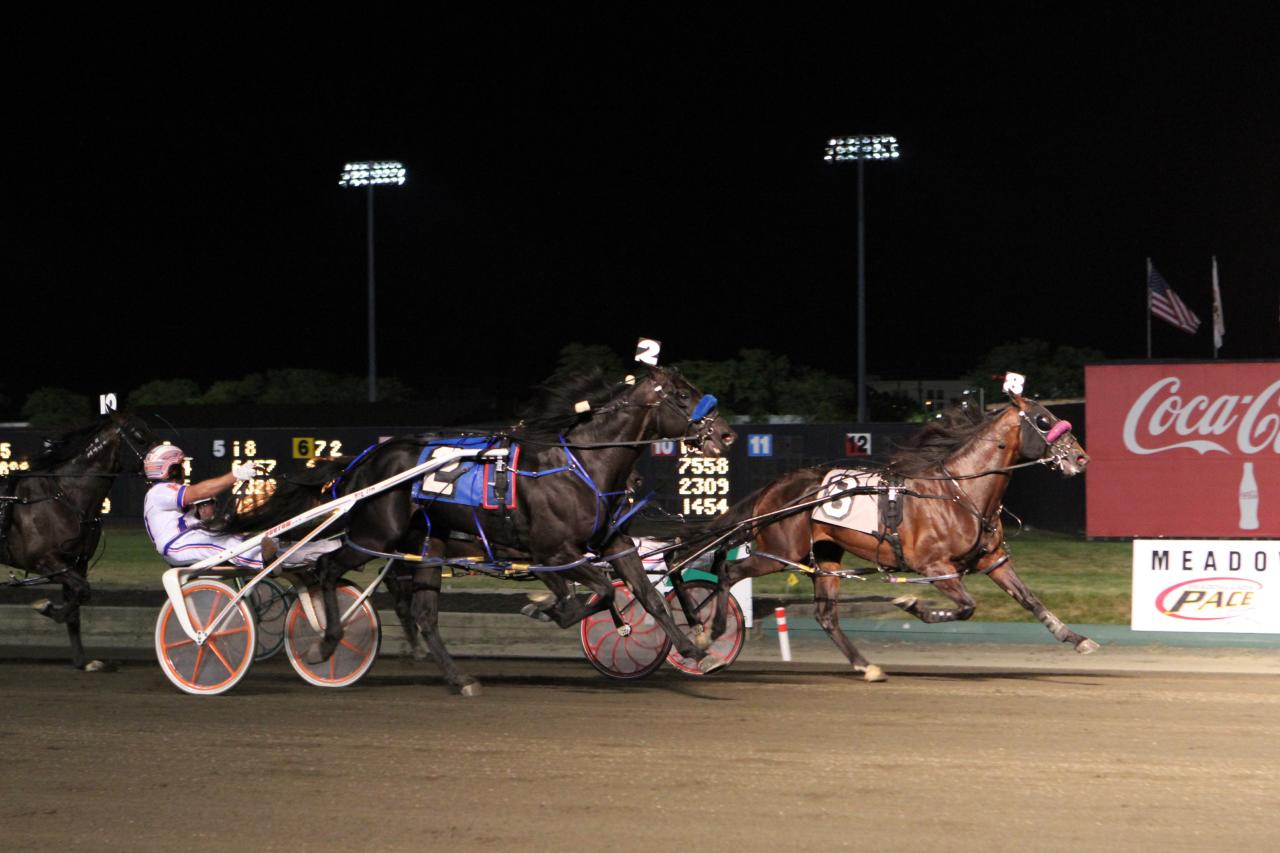
- Roll With Joe (8, in first) and Big Jim (2, in second) at the 2011 Meadowlands Pace
- Location: Meadowlands Racing & Entertainment, East Rutherford, New Jersey
- Inaugurated: 1977 (49 years ago)
- Race type: Standardbred (Pace)
- Website: Meadowlands Pace Website

Race information
- Distance: 1 mile (8.0 furlongs)
- Surface: Dirt
- Track: Left-handed
- Qualification: 3-year-olds
- Purse: $656,000 (2025)

The Meadowlands Pace is a harness race for three-year-old pacers, held at the Meadowlands Racetrack, in East Rutherford, New Jersey. Along with the Hambletonian Stakes for trotters, the Meadowlands Pace is considered to be one of the track's signature three-year-old events.

== Records ==
Most wins by a driver

- 7 – John Campbell (1982, 1989, 1994, 1995, 1999, 2001, 2002)

Most wins by a trainer

- 5 – Brett Pelling (1995, 1997, 1999, 2005, 2023)

Stakes record

- 1:46 3/5 – Legendary Hanover (2024)

== Meadowlands Pace winners ==
Year	Winner	Driver	Trainer	Owner	Time	Purse
2026	Brandon Blvd	Dexter Dunn	Andrew Harris	Punisher 11 Stable	1:48 1/5	$810,000
2025	Madden Oaks (Note: Prince Hal Hanover finished first, but was disqualified and placed second due to interference in the stretch.)	Braxten Boyd	Cameron Capone	Samir Tawil, Paul Kautz, Alexander Henn, Nathan Fullmer	1:47 4/5	$656,000
2024	Legendary Hanover	James MacDonald	Anthony Beaton	Eric Good, West Wins Stable, Mark Dumain	1:46 3/5	$650,000
2023	Confederate	Tim Tetrick	Brett Pelling	Diamond Creek Racing LLC	1:47 0/0	$668,000
2022	Beach Glass	Yannick Gingras	Brent MacGrath	Schooner II Stables	1:47 2/5	$600,000
2021	Lawless Shadow (Note: Charlie May finished first but was disqualified due to interference.)	Mark MacDonald	Dr. Ian Moore	Dr. Ian Moore, RG McGroup Ltd., Serge Savard, Frank Cannon	1:48 3/5	$700,000
2020	Tall Dark Stranger	Yannick Gingras	Nancy Takter	Crawford Farms Racing, Marvin Katz, Caviart Farms, Howard Taylor	1:47 2/5	$636,650
2019	Best In Show	Brian Sears	Linda Toscano	Richard P. Young, Joanne Young	1:48 0/0	$682,650
2018	Courtly Choice	David Miller	Blake Macintosh	Hutt Racing Stable, Mac & Heim Stables, Daniel Plouffe, Touch Stone Farms	1:47 1/5	$701,830
2017	Huntsville	Tim Tetrick	Ray Schnittker	Raymond W. Schnittker, Theodore Gewertz, Steven Arnold	1:47 4/5	$738,550
2016	Control The Moment	Brian Sears	Brad Maxwell	Control The Moment Stable	1:48 2/5	$732,050
2015	Wiggle It Jiggleit	Montrell Teague	Clyde Francis	George Teague, Jr.	1:47 4/5	$706,000
2014	He's Watching	Tim Tetrick	David Menary	Menary Racing, Brad Gray, Michael Guerriero, Muscara Racing Trust	1:46 4/5	$776,000
2013	Captaintreacherous	Tim Tetrick	Tony Alagna	Captaintreacherous Racing Stable	1:48 1/5	$635,750
2012	A Rocknroll Dance	Yannick Gingras	Jim Mulinix	Jim Mulinix, Denny Miller, Diamond Creek Farm, Jerry & Teresa Silva Stable	1:48 1/5	$1,000,000
2011	Roll with Joe	Ronald Pierce	Edward Hart	Blue Chip, Steven Demeter, Not to Worry Stable, Winbak Farm	1:48 2/5	$1,000,000
2010	One More Laugh	Tim Tetrick	Ray Schnittker	Schnittker, Silva, Meinzinger	1:47 4/5	$1,000,000
2009	Well Said	Ronald Pierce	Steve Elliott	Jeffrey S. Snyder & Lothlorien Equestrian	1:47 3/5	$1,000,000
2008	Art Official	Ronald Pierce	Joe Seekman	Sawgrass Farms	1:47 0/0	$1,000,000
2007	Southwind Lynx	Tim Tetrick	George Teague, Jr.	K&R Racing & Teague Inc.	1:49 1/5	$1,000,000
2006	Artistic Fella	Catello Manzi	Steve Elliott	Joseph Alborano	1:48 4/5	$1,000,000
2005	Rocknroll Hanover	Brian Sears	Brett Pelling	Jeffrey S. Snyder & Lothlorien Equestrian Center	1:48 3/5	$1,000,000
2004	Holborn Hanover	Jim Morrill, Jr.	Mark Harder	John Fielding & Canamerica Capital Corp.	1:49 0/0	$1,000,000
2003	Allamerican Theory	Michel Lachance	Des Tackoor	John Levy Racing Ltd. & Mark Scholes	1:49 3/5	$1,000,000
2002	Mach Three	John Campbell	Monte Gelrod	Joseph V. Muscara	1:49 0/0	$1,000,000
2001	Real Desire	John Campbell	Blair Burgess	Brittany Farms & Karin Olssen-Burgess, Perretti Farms, Robert Burgess	1:49 3/5	$1,000,000
2000	Gallo Blue Chip	Daniel Dubé	Mark Ford	Martin Scharf	1:50 4/5	$1,150,000
1999	The Panderosa	John Campbell	Brett Pelling	Peter Pan Stables Inc. (Robert Glazer)	1:49 3/5	$1,000,000
1998	Day In A Life	Luc Ouellette	Monte Gelrod	R. Peter Heffering & Schoor Racing Stable	1:51 1/5	$1,000,000
1997	Dream Away	Ronald Pierce	Brett Pelling	Katz, Goldband & Libfeld	1:50 2/5	$1,000,000
1996	Hot Lead	George Brennan	Brian Magie	White Birch Farm	1:51 4/5	$1,000,000
1995	David's Pass	John Campbell	Brett Pelling	RJS Stable	1:50 4/5	$1,000,000
1994	Cam's Card Shark	John Campbell	William Robinson	Jeffrey S. Snyder	1:50 0/0	$1,000,000
1993	Presidential Ball	Jack Moiseyev	William Robinson	Antonio Chiaravalle	1:50 0/0	$1,000,000
1992	Carlsbad Cam	Rod Allen	Carl Allen	Carl & Rod Allen Stb. & Loren Houston	1:51 0/0	$1,000,000
1991	Precious Bunny	Jack Moiseyev	William Robinson	R. Peter Heffering	1:49 4/5	$1,000,000
1990	Beach Towel	Ray Remmen	Ray Remmen	Uptown Stable	1:52 3/5	$1,153,500
1989	Dexter Nukes	John Campbell	George Gilmour	Thomas Dexter	1:51 3/5	$852,000
1988	Matt's Scooter	Michel Lachance	Harry J. Poulton	Gordon & Illa Rumpel, Charles Juravinski	1:52 1/5	$1,039,000
1987	Frugal Gourmet	Trevor Ritchie	Blair Burgess	Excellent Stb. of Toronto	1:52 0/0	$902,500
1986	Laughs	Buddy Gilmour	Charles Sylvester	Friends Stable	1:52 1/5	$1,025,500
1985	Nihilator	Bill O'Donnell	Billy Haughton	Wall St./Nihilator Syndicate	1:50 3/5	$1,018,000
1984	On The Road Again	Buddy Gilmour	Harry J. Poulton	Gordon & Illa Rumpel	1:53 3/5	$1,293,000
1983	Ralph Hanover	Ron Waples	Stewart Firlotte	Ron Waples, Pointsetta Stables, Grants Direct Stables	1:54 1/5	$1,251,000
1982	Hilarion	John Campbell	Jerry Silverman	Star Stables	1:54 1/5	$1,000,000
1981	Conquered	John Hayes, Jr.	John Hayes, Jr.	Beejay Stables & C. Juravinski	1:53 4/5	$1,000,000
1980	Niatross	Clint Galbraith	Clint Galbraith	Niatross Stable, Niagra Acres & Clint Galbraith	1:53 1/5	$1,101,000
1979	Sonsam	George Sholty	George Sholty	Sonsam Stable	1:53 2/5	$750,000
1978	Falcon Almahurst	Billy Haughton	Billy Haughton	Hill Farms	1:55 1/5	$280,000
1977	Escort	Carl LeCause	Carl LeCause	Bernard & Rosalind Mann	1:54 4/5	$212,500
