= Mohawk Gold Cup =

- Class: Grade III
- Location: Campbellville, Ontario
- Inaugurated: 1950
- Race type: Harness race for Standardbred pacers
- Website: Woodbine Entertainment Group

Race information
- Distance: 1 mile (1,609 metres or 8 furlongs)
- Surface: Dirt, ⅞ mile oval
- Track: Woodbine Mohawk Park
- Qualification: Invitational
- Purse: $100,000 (2025)

The Mohawk Gold Cup is an invitational harness race for Standardbred pacers age three and older. It is run at a distance of one mile at Woodbine Mohawk Park in Campbellville, Ontario.

The race has been a permanent fixture at Mohawk Raceway since 2011 but was initially run at Greenwood Raceway in Toronto and would also be hosted in various years by both Woodbine Racetrack and Mohawk Raceway.

It was named as a Grade III race when graded stakes classifications were introduced to harness racing in 2025.

== Records ==
Most wins by a driver

- 4 – Douglas S. Brown (1981, 1990, 1996, 1998) & Paul MacDonell (1995, 1997, 2001, 2009)

Most wins by a trainer

- 6 – William G. Robinson (1978, 1981, 1994, 1996, 1999, 2002)

Stakes record

- 1:47 1/5 – Always B Miki (2016)

== Winners of the Mohawk Gold Cup ==
| Year | Winner | Age | Driver | Trainer | Owner | Time | Purse |
|---|---|---|---|---|---|---|---|
| 2025 | Brue Hanover | 5 | Yannick Gingras | Dave Menary | Burke Racing Stable, Weaver Bruscemi | 1:47 4/5 | $100,000 |
| 2024 | Linedrive Hanover | 6 | James MacDonald | Anthony Beaton | West Wins Stable, McKinlay & Fielding, Mac Nichol | 1:47 2/5 | $100,000 |
| 2023 | Abuckabett Hanover | 5 | Andrew McCarthy | Andrew Harris | Andrew Harris, William Pollock, Bruce Areman | 1:47 2/5 | $100,000 |
| 2022 | Jimmy Freight | 7 | Louis-Philippe Roy | Richard Moreau | Adriano Sorella | 1:48 0/0 | $100,000 |
| 2021 | Allywag Hanover | 4 | Todd McCarthy | Brett Pelling | Allywag Stable | 1:48 1/5 | $100,000 |
| 2020 | No Race | - | -- | No Race | No Race | 0:00 0/0 | 000 |
| 2019 | Jimmy Freight | 4 | Louis-Philippe Roy | Richard Moreau | Adriano Sorella | 1:48 1/5 | $100,000 |
| 2018 | Sintra | 5 | Jody Jamieson | Dave Menary | Brad Gray, Michael Guerriero, Menary Racing Inc. | 1:48 0/0 | $100,000 |
| 2017 | McWicked | 6 | David Miller | Casie Coleman | Ed James | 1:48 2/5 | $100,000 |
| 2016 | Always B Miki | 5 | David Miller | Jimmy Takter | Bluewood Stable, Roll The Dice Stable, Christina Takter | 1:47 1/5 | $100,000 |
| 2015 | State Treasurer | 6 | Chris Christoforou | Ian Moore | Paul MacDonald & Sally MacDonald | 1:48 3/5 | $100,000 |
| 2014 | Evenin Of Pleasure | 4 | Sylvain Filion | Richard Moreau | Gestion Jean Yves Blais | 1:49 2/5 | $100,000 |
| 2013 | Warrawee Needy | 4 | Jody Jamieson | Carl Jamieson | C. Jamieson, Dr. Michael Wilson, Thomas Kyron, Floyd Marshall | 1:48 3/5 | $100,000 |
| 2012 | We Will See | 5 | Ronald Pierce | Sam DePinto | Shannon DePinto, Earl Smith, J And T Silva Stables LLC | 1:48 2/5 | $100,000 |
| 2011 | Won The West | 7 | David Miller | Ron Burke | Country Club Acres Inc, Strollin Stable, William G. Robinson | 1:47 2/5 | $100,000 |
| 2010 | Foiled Again | 6 | Yannick Gingras | Ron Burke | Burke Racing Stable LLC, Weaver Bruscemi LLC, JJK Stables LLC | 1:48 3/5 | $100,000 |
| 2009 | Bigtime Ball | 5 | Paul MacDonell | Gordon Irwin | Irwin Stables Inc. | 1:50 3/5 | $100,000 |
| 2008 | No Race | - | -- | No Race | No Race | 0:00 0/0 | 000 |
| 2007 | Escape The Wind | 7 | Roger Mayotte | Roger Mayotte | Venture 2000 Stable | 1:52 3/5 | $100,000 |
| 2006 | Primetime Bobcat | 9 | Jody Jamieson | Anthony Montini | A. Montini, B. Michele, W. Rogers | 1:49 3/5 | $100,000 |
| 2005 | Escape The Wind | 5 | Roger Mayotte | Roger Mayotte | Venture 2000 Stable & Early Bird Stables | 1:51 3/5 | $100,000 |
| 2004 | Casimir Camotion | 4 | Patrick Lachance | Patrick Lachance | M And M Harness Racing LLC | 1:50 2/5 | $100,000 |
| 2003 | No Race | - | -- | No Race | No Race | 0:00 0/0 | 000 |
| 2002 | DB Bopper | 6 | Randy Waples | William G. Robinson | Joseph Muscara | 1:51 0/0 | $100,000 |
| 2001 | Camotion | 4 | Paul MacDonell | Benjamin Wallace | Tony Aarts, Mottram Stable | 1:50 0/0 | $150,000 |
| 2000 | Time Share | 3 | Luc Ouellette | Rich Chansky, Jr. | M. Zimmerman, M. Barnett | 1:51 0/0 | $100,000 |
| 1999 | Royalflush Hanover | 3 | Randy Waples | William G. Robinson | Jeffrey S. Snyder | 1:53 1/5 | $100,000 |
| 1998 | Memphis Flash | 3 | Douglas S. Brown | John Hayes | John Hayes Stb. Ltd., Ned Gvoich, Kim Kaplan, Singles Doubles Stb. | 1:53 0/0 | $100,000 |
| 1997 | Northern Luck | 3 | Paul MacDonell | Jack Darling | Jack Darling Stables & Dan Smith | 1:53 2/5 | $100,000 |
| 1996 | Oye Vay | 3 | Douglas S. Brown | William G. Robinson | Marilyn Fromowitz | 1:53 1/5 | $100,000 |
| 1995 | Village Connection | 3 | Paul MacDonell | William Wellwood | Wellwood Stables | 1:55 3/5 | $150,000 |
| 1994 | Pacific Rocket | 3 | Jack Moiseyev | William G. Robinson | R. Peter Heffering, Ed Lohmeyer John Stoddard, John Vankirk | 1:53 2/5 | $75,000 |
| 1993 | No Race | - | -- | No Race | No Race | 0:00 0/0 | 000 |
| 1992 | Staying Together | 3 | Tom Strauss | Jack Parsons | Robert Hamather | 1:53 3/5 | $50,000 |
| 1991 | Jake And Elwood | 4 | John Campbell | Ken Seeber | L P G Standardbred Assoc., MRF Racing Stable & Bonnie Castle Stable | 1:52 4/5 | $75,000 |
| 1990 | Topnotcher | 4 | Douglas S. Brown | Rene Laarman | Alexander Horn & Alan Berk | 1:52 4/5 | $197,750 |
| 1989 | Matt's Scooter | 4 | Michel Lachance | Harry J. Poulton | G. & I. Rumpel & Charles Juravinski | 1:51 0/0 | $154,500 |
| 1988 | Jaguar Spur | 4 | Richard L. Stillings | Richard L. Stillings | Roy Davis & Barberry Farm | 1:54 0/0 | $117,000 |
| 1987 | Dragon's Lair | 5 | John Campbell | Charles Sylvester | Dragon's Lair Syndicate | 1:55 0/0 | $105,000 |
| 1986 | Armbro Dallas | 4 | Ron Waples | Ron Waples | Waples Stable, Lothlorien Equestrian | 1:54 3/5 | $107,000 |
| 1985 | On The Road Again | 4 | Buddy Gilmour | Harry J. Poulton | Gord & Illa Rumpel, The Road Group, Blue Chip Partners | 1:58 0/0 | $75,000 |
| 1984 | Mr Dalrae | 5 | Dave Magee | Jim Dennis | A La Carte Racing Stable | 1:54 1/5 | $75,000 |
| 1983 | Cam Fella | 4 | Pat Crowe | Pat Crowe | N. Clements, N. Faulkner & JEF’s Stb | 1:55 3/5 | $75,000 |
| 1982 | Fan Hanover | 4 | Glen Garnsey | Glen Garnsey | Dr. Glen Brown | 1:56 0/0 | $75,000 |
| 1981 | Lime Time | 6 | Douglas S. Brown | William G. Robinson | Antonio Chiaravalle | 1:57 1/5 | $75,000 |
| 1980 | Le Baron Rouge | 8 | Ron Waples | Albert Bertrand | The Baron Rouge Stable | 1:56 2/5 | $75,000 |
| 1979 | Try Scotch | 5 | Shelly Goudreau | Shelly Goudreau | T. Crouch, S. Newcom & C. Mahlstedt | 1:56 2/5 | $75,000 |
| 1978 | Dream Maker | 5 | Ron Waples | William G. Robinson | Antonio Chiaravalle | 1:58 0/0 | $59,800 |
| 1977 | Jambo Dancer | 5 | Charles Lawson | Kent Baker | M. & G. Stable | 1:59 1/5 | $59,000 |
| 1976 | Jambo Dancer | 4 | Charles Lawson | Kent Baker | M. & G. Stable | 2:00 1/5 | $29,000 |
