= Brian Sears =

Driver of harness racing horses

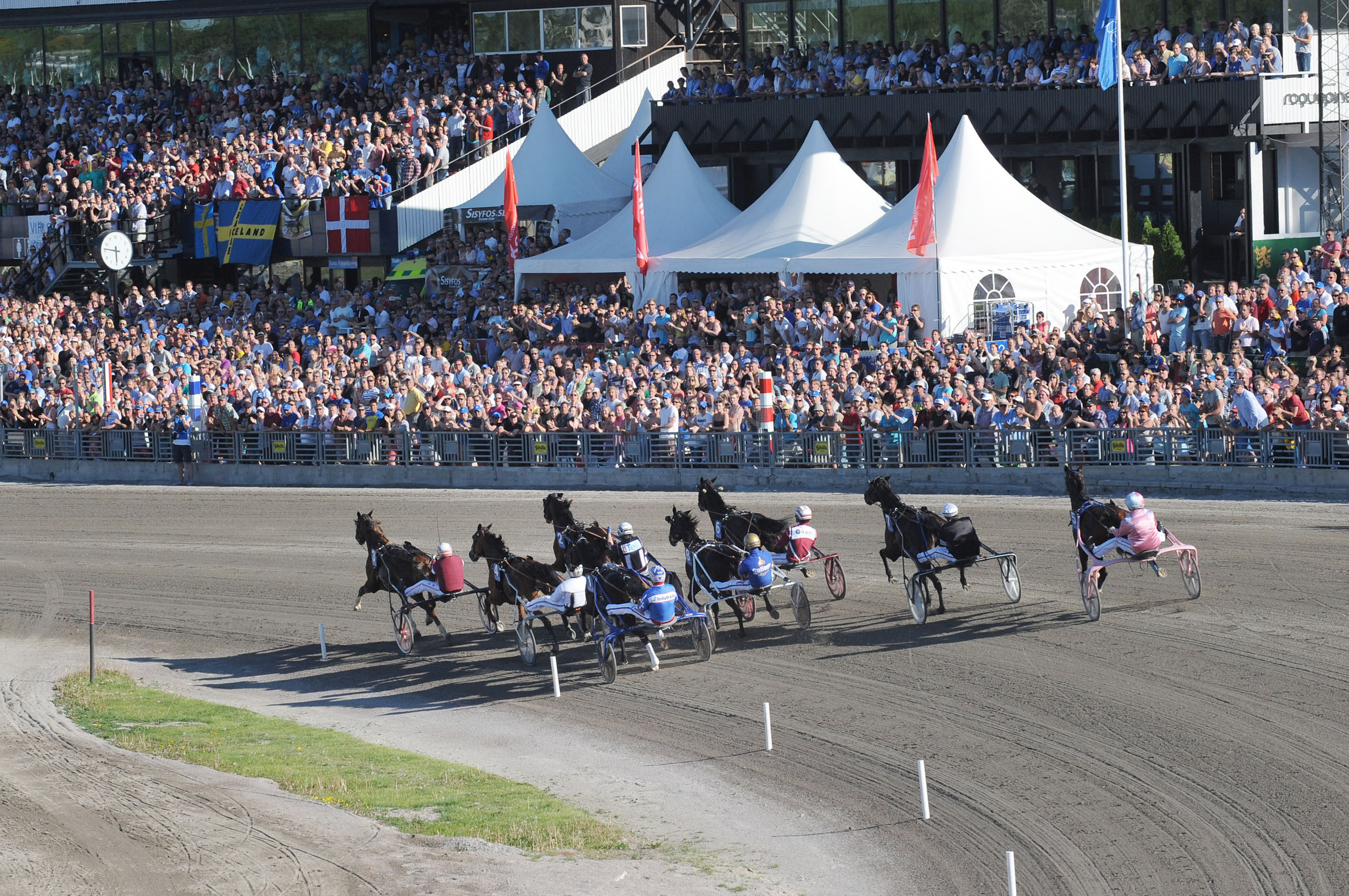
- Elitloppet 2012

Personal information
- Born: January 21, 1968 Fort Lauderdale, Florida
- Occupation: Harness racing driver

Horse racing career
- Sport: Horse racing
- Career wins: 10,423 wins (as of 11/18/2023)

Major racing wins
- Adios Pace (2001, 2010); Metro Pace (2004, 2008); Glen Garnsey Memorial Pace (2005, 2006, 2008, 2014); Meadowlands Pace (2005, 2016); North America Cup (2005, 2014); Canadian Pacing Derby (2006, 2007, 2008); Woodrow Wilson Pace (2008, 2009, 2011); Maple Leaf Trot (2008, 2015); Canadian Trotting Classic (2009, 2013); Hambletonian Oaks (2009, 2013) Breeders Crown wins: Breeders Crown 3YO Filly Trot (2003, 2004, 2005, 2009, 2013) †; Breeders Crown 3YO Colt & Gelding Pace (2004, 2005, 2014); Breeders Crown 3YO Colt & Gelding Trot (2004, 2005, 2007, 2009, 2010); Breeders Crown Open Pace (2005, 2006, 2008); Breeders Crown 3YO Filly Pace (2006, 2007); Breeders Crown Open Trot (2006, 2016); Breeders Crown 2YO Colt & Gelding Trot (2008); Breeders Crown Open Mare Pace (2008); Breeders Crown 2YO Filly Pace (2009, 2011) U.S. Pacing Triple Crown wins: Cane Pace (2007, 2016); Messenger Stakes (2007); Little Brown Jug (2013) U.S. Trotting Triple Crown wins: Yonkers Trot (2005, 2015); Kentucky Futurity (2009); Hambletonian Stakes (2009, 2013, 2015) † Denotes record

Racing awards
- Dan Patch Rising Star Award (1991)

Honours
- United States Harness Racing Hall of Fame (2017)

Significant horses
- Bee A Magician, Muscle Hill; Rocknroll Hanover

Brian J. Sears (born January 21, 1968, in Fort Lauderdale, Florida) is a driver of harness racing horses who in 2016 was elected to the Harness Racing Hall of Fame. He has won 10,423 races with purses in excess of $216 million. He was inducted to the Harness Racing Museum in Goshen, New York at July 2, 2017.
