= Jimmy Takter =

Swedish horse trainer

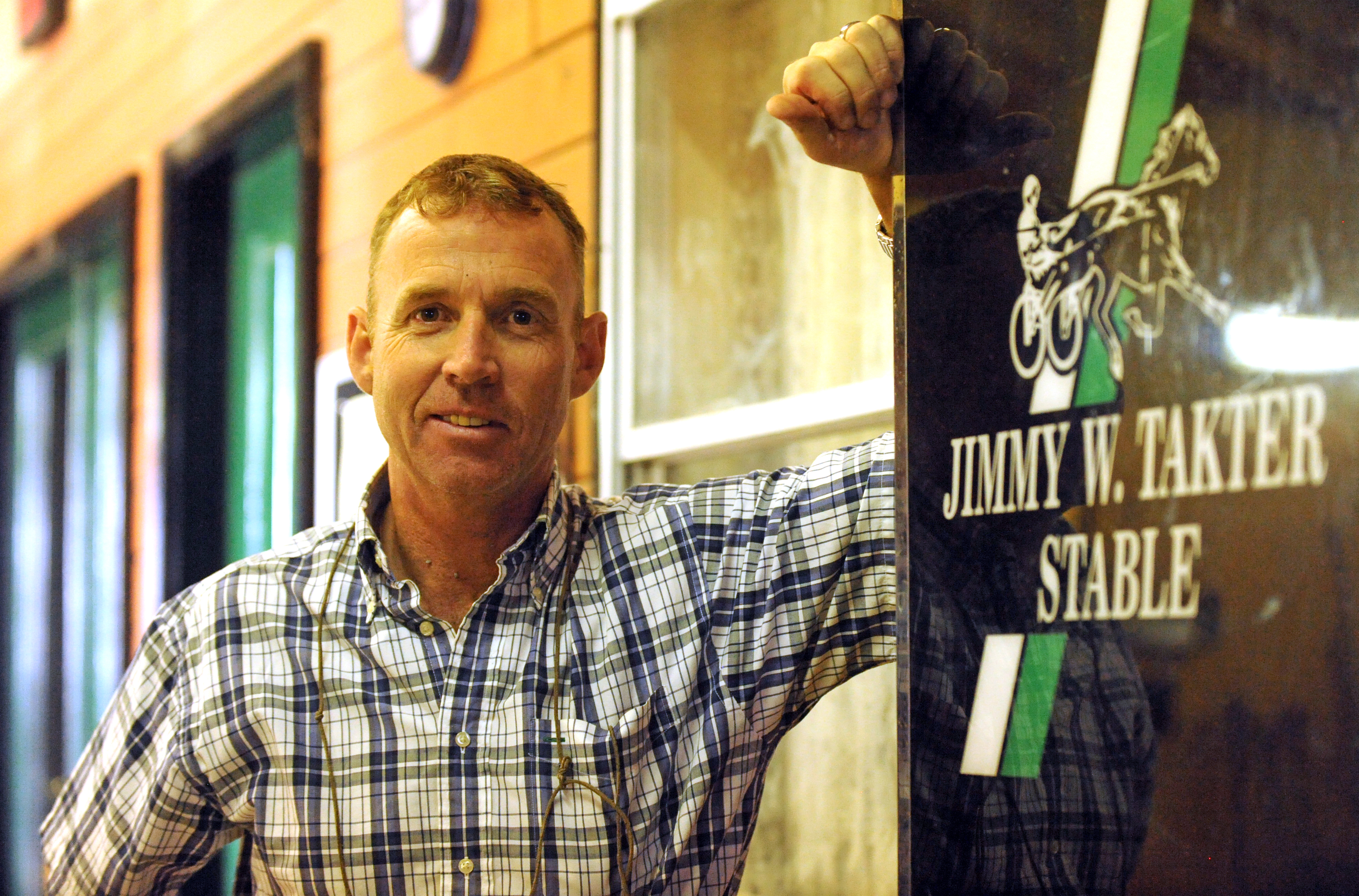

Personal information
- Born: September 29, 1960 (age 66) Norrköping, Östergötland, Sweden
- Occupations: Harness racing driver & trainer

Horse racing career
- Sport: Horse racing

Major racing wins
- Canadian Trotting Classic (1997, 2002, 2014, 2015, 2016) '†'; Hambletonian Oaks (1994, 2003, 2006, 2014, 2015, 2016) '†'; Ben Franklin Free-For-All Pace (2010, 2016); Metro Pace (2011); TVG Free For All Pace (2016); Gold Cup Invitational Pace (2016) U.S. Pacing Triple Crown wins: Little Brown Jug (2006) U.S. Trotting Triple Crown wins: Hambletonian (1997, 2010, 2014, 2015) Breeders Crown wins: Breeders Crown 2YO Filly Trot (1993, 1996, 2004, 2005, 2012, 2013, 2015, 2016) '†'; Breeders Crown 2YO Colt & Gelding Trot (1996, 2004, 2011, 2013, 2014) '†'; Breeders Crown 3YO Colt & Gelding Trot (1997, 2002, 2008, 2014, 2015, 2016) '†'; Breeders Crown Open Trot (2006,2015); Breeders Crown 2YO Filly Pace (2010, 2013, 2015,2016); Breeders Crown 2YO Colt & Gelding Pace (2012); Breeders Crown 3YO Filly Trot (2014, 2015); Breeders Crown Open Pace (2015, 2016) International race wins: Elitloppet (1998); Prix d'Amérique (1999) † denotes record

Racing awards
- Dan Patch Trainer of the Year Award (1996, 2000, 2010, 2014, 2015, 2016,

Honours
- U.S. Harness Racing Hall of Fame (2012); Canadian Horse Racing Hall of Fame (2019)

Significant horses
- Always B. Miki, Malabar Man, Moni Maker, Pure Country, Sir Taurus, See You At Peelers, Bar Hopping, Father Patrick, Vintage Master, Tom Ridge, Shake It Cerry
- Updated on January 10, 2017

Jimmy Takter (born September 29, 1960, in Norrköping, Sweden) is a harness racing horse trainer based in East Windsor, New Jersey, who came to the U.S. in 1982. He was inducted into the U.S. Harness Racing Hall of Fame in 2012.

== Background ==
Takter is the son of Swedish trainer Bo William Takter. He was originally a driver, earning his first win at Jagersro racetrack in Malmo, Sweden at age 18. He moved to the United States in 1978 to work for Continental Farms Stable, then returned to Sweden where he married Christina, his childhood sweetheart. The two permanently moved to the United States in December 1982 and have four children, Nancy, Jenny, Tiffany and Jimmy, Jr. Takter became a U.S. citizen in 2000. Christina handles his books and stable business.

== Racing career ==
Takter won his first race in North America as a driver with Baltic Speed in 1983. He earned his first win as a trainer with Witsend's Apollo in 1984, whose 30 wins were critical to Takter's early success. "He was a very important horse," said Takter. "He came along at the right time and he supported our family for a couple of years and he meant a lot to my wife and me. A horse like that gave me the ability to develop as a trainer."

By the early 1990s, Takter was considered one of the leading trainers on the Grand Circuit. In 1996 he earned his first Trainer of the Year Award thanks to 2-year-old trotting champions Armbro Prowess and Malabar Man. In 1997, Malabar Man went on to win the Hambletonian, All-American and Breeders Crown and was named the Harness Horse of the Year.

From 1997 through 2000, Takter raced Moni Maker at tracks around the United States and abroad, winning such races as the Breeders' Crown, Elitloppet and Prix d'Amerique. Moni Maker was a three-time trotter of the year and retired as the highest earning Standardbred of all-time.

As of December 2016, horses trained by Takter had accumulated $120 million in earnings and more than 1,700 wins. He owns a 100-acre training facility in New Jersey that contains a 5/8-mile track, a 3/4-mile straight track, and a 2-mile jogging track.

In October 2015, Takter had a career highlight, earning $2,691,439 in the 2015 Breeders Crown Finals.

During his career, Takter has won the Dan Patch Trainer of the Year Award six times, the most of any trainer. In 2019, he was inducted into the Canadian Horse Racing Hall of Fame.
