= Freehold Raceway =

Former harness racetrack in New Jersey, US

- Interactive map of Freehold Raceway
- Location: Freehold, New Jersey, United States
- Coordinates: 40.254999°N 74.28762°W
- Owned by: Penn Entertainment; Greenwood Racing
- Date opened: 1830s (informally); 1854 (officially)
- Date closed: December 28, 2024
- Race type: Harness
- Course type: Dirt
- Notable races: Cane Pace (1998–2010)

Freehold Raceway was a half-mile (0.80 km) harness racetrack in Freehold, New Jersey, United States. At the time of its closure in December 2024, it was the oldest racetrack in the United States.

== History ==
Horse races have been taking place at Freehold Raceway since the 1830s. The Monmouth County Agricultural Society was formed on December 17, 1853, and in 1854 they began holding an annual fair at Freehold Raceway with harness racing.

In 1984, an electrical fire destroyed the main building. Racing was then held under tents until the new building was completed in 1986.

In 1990, Freehold Raceway Mall opened up across the street, and was, until 2007, decorated with harness racing motif.

In 1998, Freehold was acquired by a joint venture of Penn National Gaming and Greenwood Racing, owner of Parx Casino and Racing.

From 1998 to 2010, Freehold Raceway was the home of the Cane Pace, a harness horse race run annually since 1955; in 1956 the race joined with the Little Brown Jug and the Messenger Stakes to become the first leg in the Triple Crown of Harness Racing for Pacers.

In 2005, Freehold was also the temporary home of the Yonkers Trot, part of the Triple Crown of Harness Racing for Trotters, while renovations took place at Yonkers Raceway.

=== Closure ===
In September 2024 track officials announced that Freehold Raceway would close at the end of the year, with the track's general manager citing operational reasons with no "plausible way forward." Freehold's last racing program was held on December 28, 2024, with over 1,000 spectators in attendance. The final race was won by T's Raider II, driven by Johnathan Ahle.

As of the announcement of its closure, there was no word on future plans for the Freehold Raceway site.

By 2026, plans are in the works to redevelop the entire Freehold Raceway site into retail which would include shops and restaurants. There is also plans to add some sort of housing on site. Plans for this new development are currently on going and are partially the result of the continued success of Freehold Raceway Mall which neighbors the property.

== Triple dead heat ==
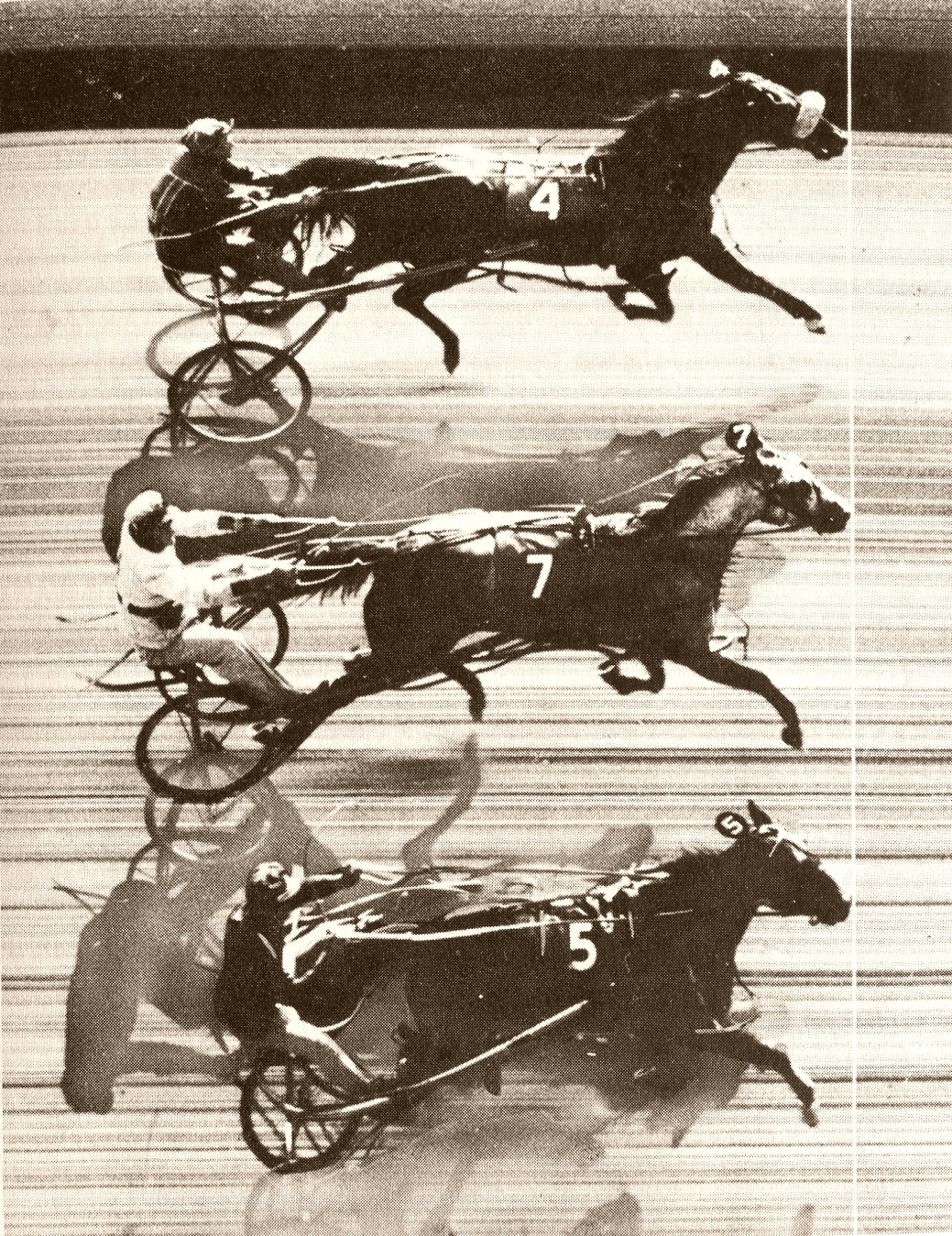
An extremely rare photo finish triple dead heat, recorded in a 1953 harness race at Freehold Raceway

Freehold Raceway was the site of the first ever photo finish triple dead heat win in a harness race. Double, triple and even quadruple dead heats were more commonly awarded in horse racing when finishes were judged by the naked eye in real time. With the advent of photo finish technology in the second quarter of the 20th century, there was a significant decrease in dead heats.

During a harness race on October 3, 1953, the noses of horses Patchover (driven by Ed Myer), Payne Hall (F. Albertson) and Penny Maid (E. Beede) passed the finish line at exactly the same time.

== See also ==
- Gambling in New Jersey
