= Harrah's Pompano Beach =

Casino and Former Harness racetrack in Florida

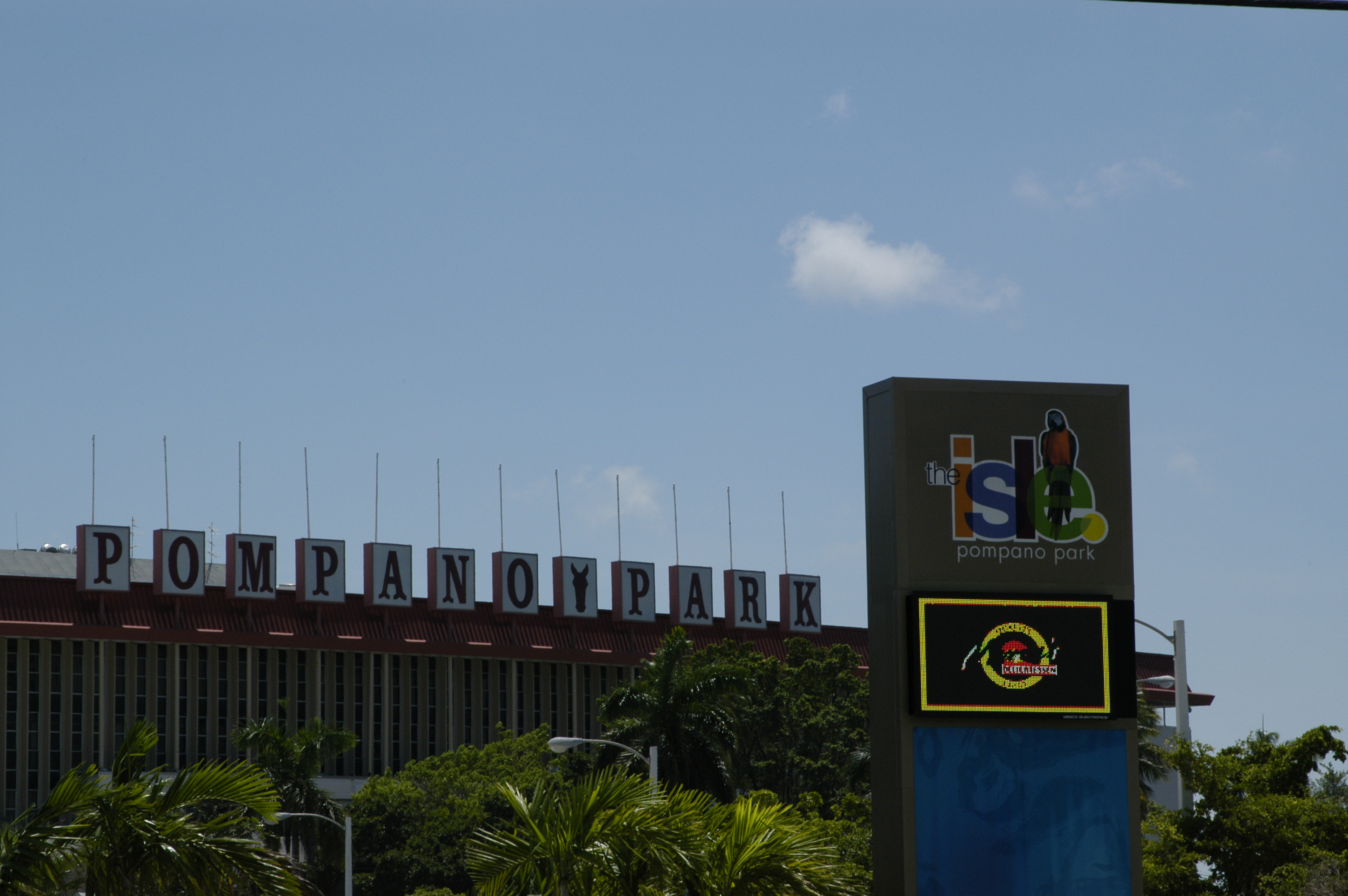
- Interactive map of Harrah's Pompano Beach
- Location: 777 Isle of Capri Blvd; Pompano Beach, FL 33069
- Coordinates: 26°13′44″N 80°09′07″W
- Owned by: Caesars Entertainment
- Date opened: February 4, 1964
- Date closed: April 17, 2022 (racetrack)
- Race type: Harness racing

Harrah's Pompano Beach, formerly Isle Casino Racing Pompano Park and Pompano Park, is a casino and former standardbred harness racing track located inPompano Beach, Florida, owned and operated by Caesars Entertainment.

Harness racing was held at the racetrack from 1964 to 2022.

== History ==
Pompano Park race track opened on February 4, 1964. The racetrack was billed as "The Winter Home of Harness Racing", as its tropical South Florida location made it an ideal alternative for horsemen, when most of the racetracks to the north are subject to racing in snow, ice, and bitter cold conditions. The racetrack was 5/8 of a mile in diameter, and featured a marl racing surface.

The track operated its live racing meet for about ten months out of every year, with a short break from June to August. Like most racetracks, Pompano showed simulcast horse races from all over the US and Canada, allowing its patrons to wager on racing approximately 363 days per year. Over time, it was converted into a racino with slot machines and a poker room.

In 2018, Eldorado Resorts (now Caesars Entertainment) announced a joint venture with the Cordish Companies to develop the area surrounding Pompano Park with a mixed-use project including retail, dining, office, residential, and hotel elements.

=== Closure of the race track ===
In 2022, the property was rebranded as Harrah's Pompano Park. Plans were then announced to close and demolish the track. On April 17, the track held its final race card. Demolition of the race track began in May 2023, although the grandstands remain.

== See also ==
- List of casinos in Florida
