= Breeders Crown =

Series of harness races

The Breeders Crown is an annual series of harness races in the United States and Canada covering each of the sport's twelve traditional categories of age, gait, and gender. The series was initiated by the Hambletonian Society, promoters of the Hambletonian Stakes, in 1984 to enhance the Standardbred breeding industry and to promote the sport of harness racing by providing a lucrative, high-profile championship race in each of these categories. The races are promoted as year-end championships for each division with the tagline "it all comes down to the Breeders Crown."

For its first 15 years, races were contested at tracks around North America. After a 1998 appearance at the then-new Colonial Downs near Richmond, Virginia, the series has rotated between The Meadowlands (near New York City), Mohegan Sun at Pocono Downs (in Wilkes-Barre, Pennsylvania), Harrah's Hoosier Park, and the Greater Toronto Area's two tracks, Woodbine Racetrack and Mohawk Racetrack. Since 2010, all races in each edition have been held at the one track.

== List of Races ==
- Breeders Crown 2YO Filly Pace
- Breeders Crown 2YO Filly Trot
- Breeders Crown 2YO Colt & Gelding Pace
- Breeders Crown 2YO Colt & Gelding Trot
- Breeders Crown 3YO Filly Pace
  - Run for the Max C. Hempt Memorial Trophy
- Breeders Crown 3YO Filly Trot
  - Run for the John Simpson Sr. Memorial Trophy
- Breeders Crown 3YO Colt & Gelding Pace (1984-)
  - Run for the H.A. Grant Memorial Trophy
- Breeders Crown 3YO Colt & Gelding Trot (1984-)
  - Run for the John Cashman Jr. Memorial Trophy
- Breeders Crown Open Mare Pace (1986-)
- Breeders Crown Open Mare Trot (1986-1995, 2004-)
- Open Pace (1985-)
- Open Trot (1985-)

== Breeders Crown Sites ==
Year	2YO C&G Pace	2YO C&G Trot	2YO F Pace	2YO F Trot	3YO C&G Pace	3YO C&G Trot	3YO F Pace	3YO F Trot	Open Mare Pace	Open Mare Trot	Open Pace	Open Trot
2027	The Red Mile (Planned)											
2026	Scioto Downs (Planned)											
2025	Woodbine Mohawk Park											
2024	The Meadowlands											
2023	Harrah's Hoosier Park											
2022	Woodbine Mohawk Park											
2021	The Meadowlands											
2020	Harrah's Hoosier Park											
2019	Woodbine Mohawk Park											
2018	Mohegan Sun at Pocono Downs											
2017	Hoosier Park											
2016	The Meadowlands											
2015	Woodbine Racetrack											
2014	The Meadowlands											
2013	Mohegan Sun at Pocono Downs											
2012	Woodbine Racetrack											
2011	Woodbine Racetrack											
2010	Mohegan Sun at Pocono Downs											
2009	Woodbine Racetrack								The Meadowlands			
2008	The Meadowlands								Mohawk Racetrack			
2007	The Meadowlands								Mohawk Racetrack			
2006	Woodbine Racetrack								The Meadowlands			
2005	The Meadowlands								Mohawk Racetrack			
2004	Woodbine Racetrack								The Meadowlands			
2003	The Meadowlands								Woodbine Racetrack	Not contested 1996-2003	Woodbine Racetrack	
2002	Woodbine Racetrack								The Meadowlands	Not contested 1996-2003	The Meadowlands	
2001	Woodbine Racetrack								The Meadowlands	Not contested 1996-2003	The Meadowlands	
2000	Mohawk Racetrack								The Meadowlands	Not contested 1996-2003	The Meadowlands	
1999	Woodbine Racetrack								The Meadowlands	Not contested 1996-2003	The Meadowlandss	
1998	Colonial Downs								The Meadowlands	Not contested 1996-2003	The Meadowlands	
1997	Mohawk Racetrack								The Meadowlands	Not contested 1996-2003	The Meadowlands	
1996	Mohawk Racetrack				Yonkers Raceway	Vernon Downs	Yonkers Raceway	Vernon Downs	The Meadowlands	Not contested 1996-2003	The Meadowlands	
1995	Garden State Park				Woodbine Racetrack				Northfield Park	Delaware County Fairgrounds	Northfield Park	Delaware County Fairgrounds
1994	Woodbine Racetrack				Garden State Park				Freehold Raceway			
1993	Freehold Raceway	Pompano Harness	Freehold Raceway	Pompano Harness	Freehold Raceway	Pompano Harness	Freehold Raceway	Pompano Harness	Mohawk Raceway			
1992	Pompano Harness				Northfield Park	Pompano Harness	Northfield Park	Pompano Harness	Mohawk Raceway			
1991	Pompano Harness								The Meadows			
1990	Pompano Harness											
1989	Pompano Harness								Northfield Park	Blue Bonnets	Freehold Raceway	Freestate Raceway
1988	Pompano Harness				Mohawk Raceway	The Meadows	Hazel Park Raceway	Rosecroft Raceway	The Meadowlands	Batavia Downs	Scioto Downs	Saratoga Harness
1987	Rosecroft Raceway	Mohawk Raceway	Freestate Raceway	Hazel Park Harness	Pompano Harness				The Red Mile	Northfield Park	Roosevelt Raceway	The Meadowlands
1986	Garden State Park	Pompano Harness	Rosecroft Raceway	Canterbury Downs	Garden State Park			Freehold Raceway	Greenwood Raceway	Scioto Downs	Los Alamitos	Louisville Downs
1985	Rosecroft Raceway	The Meadows	Yonkers Raceway	Garden State Park		Mohawk Raceway	Northlands Park	Pompano Harness	Not contested in 1984-85		Freestate Raceway	Sportsman's Park
1984	The Meadows	The Red Mile	Maywood Park	Mohawk Raceway	Northlands Park	Pompano Harness	Liberty Bell Park Racetrack	Rosecroft Raceway	Not contested in 1984-85		Not contested	

== See also ==
- List of Breeders Crown Winners
- Breeders' Cup
