= Meadowlands Racetrack =

Horse racing track in New Jersey, US

Meadowlands Racing & Entertainment
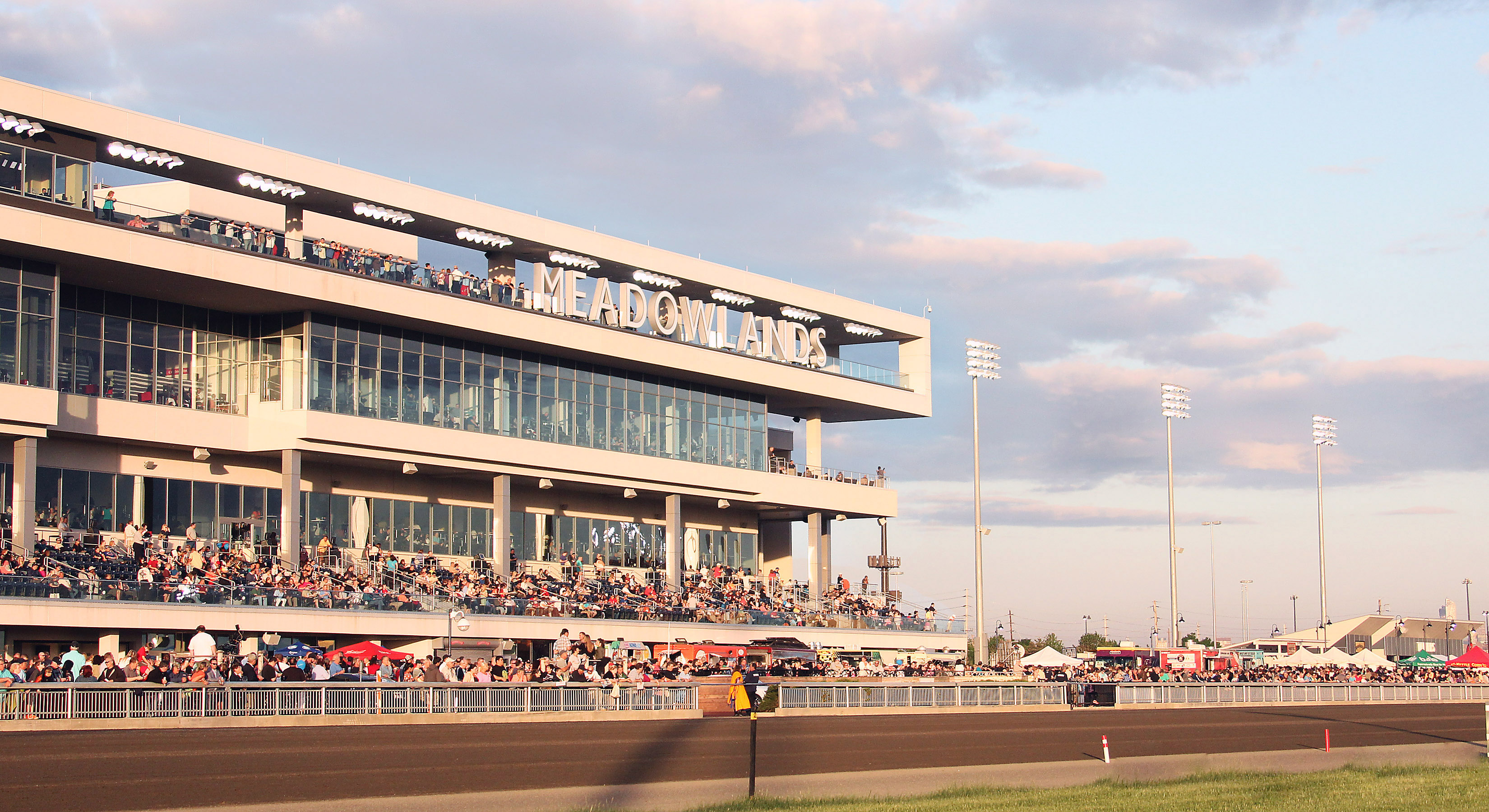
- The Meadowlands Racetrack Grandstand
- Interactive map of Meadowlands Racing & Entertainment
- Location: East Rutherford, New Jersey, U.S.A.
- Coordinates: 40°49′03″N 74°04′21″W
- Owned by: New Jersey Sports and Exposition Authority
- Operated by: New Meadowlands Racetrack LLC
- Date opened: September 1, 1976 (49 years ago)
- Screened on: Fox Sports
- Race type: Harness; Thoroughbred
- Course type: Dirt; Turf
- Notable races: Hambletonian (1981–2026); Meadowlands Pace; Cane Pace

The Meadowlands Racetrack (currently referred to as Meadowlands Racing & Entertainment) is a horse racing track at the Meadowlands Sports Complex in East Rutherford, New Jersey, United States. The track hosts both thoroughbred racing and harness racing. It is known popularly in the region as "The Big M". Meadowlands has year-round horse racing as well as a number of bars and restaurants.

== History ==
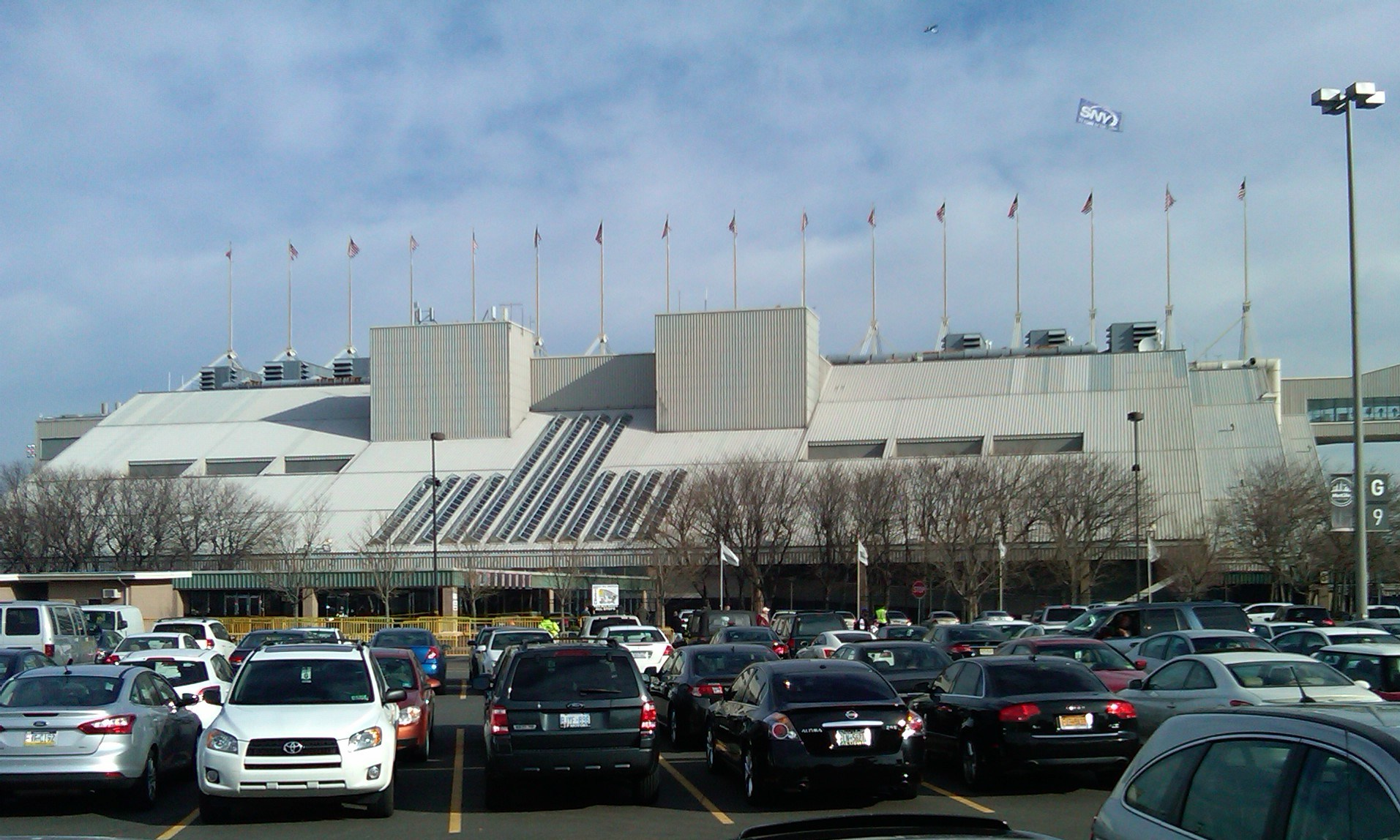
The former grandstand, circa 2011

Opened in the mid-1970s, Meadowlands Racetrack held its first-ever harness race on September 1, 1976, while thoroughbred racing commenced on September 6, 1977. With the exception of the opening season of 1976, autumn has been dedicated to the thoroughbreds, while the rest of the year features standardbreds, or harness horses.

The advertising campaign that accompanied the start of thoroughbred racing at the Meadowlands in 1977 was noted for its use of the slogan "Racing with the Moon", originally popularized in 1941 by bandleader Vaughn Monroe (alluding to the fact that post-time is in the evening – a circumstance that still pertains, although afternoon programs during long holiday weekends are occasionally put on). More recent advertising campaigns have included a direct and catchy approach to attending live racing: "It's All About Being Here – The Meadowlands!"

With its sweeping curves and wide stretches, the "Big M" has been known for exceptional times for harness racing. Opening night at the track featured the fastest harness mile run in New Jersey to that time, 1:55 3/5 by Rambling Willie. The world record for a mile by a standardbred, 1:46 4/5 by Lather Up, driven by Montrell Teague in the 2019 Graduate, matched Always B Miki's time at the Red Mile in Lexington. In 2023, Confederate set a new world record with a mile in 1:46.1 seconds.

The Meadowlands Racetrack was the site of the Hambletonian, the first leg of the Trotting Triple Crown, from 1981 until 2026. It has also been home to the Cane Pace, the first leg of Harness Racing's Pacing Triple Crown since 2015.

Leading drivers in recent seasons have included Ron Pierce, Brian Sears, George Brennan, and Tim Tetrick.

The track is operated by New Meadowlands Racetrack LLC with Jeff Gural as its CEO and chairman. Gural took over operations of the Meadowlands in December 2011.

Ken Warkentin is the current race caller and announcer for the standardbred Meadowlands meets. Matt Dinerman currently calls the thoroughbred meet. Sam McKee was also the track announcer until he suffered a stroke days after calling what no one knew at the time would be the last card he ever would call on January 21, 2017, and he died on March 7, 2017. Veteran sportscaster Dave Johnson, was the track's lead public-address announcer from its opening until the early 2000s.

In July 2009, the Meadowlands Rail Line opened for event service, but is expected to run daily upon completion of the nearby American Dream Meadowlands.

Speedway Motorsports, the Marcus Smith-headed company that owns motor racing venues founded by his father, has long had his sights on Meadowlands Racetrack for possible conversion into a short track venue for NASCAR events in the New York City area. His most recent of several attempts to purchase the track failed in the late 1990s. A report issued in January 2010 by New Jersey Governor Chris Christie discussed the idea of closing the Meadowlands Racetrack and selling it for commercial development or converting it into a NASCAR facility. Governor Christie has considered selling or leasing the racetrack to a private operator or closing it altogether.

The New Jersey Sports and Exposition Authority privatized the racetrack, to Jeffrey Gural of Newmark Knight Frank in December 2011. The privatization included $110 million of improvements consisting of a new 2,250-seat grandstand and clubhouse, designed by CGL Architects, built on the site of the former backstretch. The existing grandstand was used as an event space for Super Bowl XLVIII.

The old Meadowlands grandstand closed for racing on November 2, 2013. The new grandstand, which cost $110 million to build and can seat 2,200, opened for racing on November 23, 2013, with an estimated crowd of 15,000 in attendance. Demolition of the old Meadowlands grandstand occurred in 2022 after hosting the New Jersey Sports and Exposition Authority (NJSEA) Information technology (IT) hub and New Jersey State Police infrastructure for several years.

The Meadowlands was announced to host the championship final for the 2018 AMA Pro American Flat Track Championship motorcycle racing series, scheduled for October 6. The event, to be designated as the Meadowlands Mile, joins Turf Paradise, The Red Mile, Remington Park, and Canterbury Park as horse racing tracks that will run the series in 2018.

In June 2018, Paddy Power Betfair announced that it had partnered with Meadowlands to open a sportsbook at the track, following the state's legalization of sports betting (as facilitated by the result of Murphy v. National Collegiate Athletic Association). The sportsbook opened on July 14, 2018, under the branding of FanDuel, a daily fantasy sports service recently acquired by the company.

== Physical attributes ==
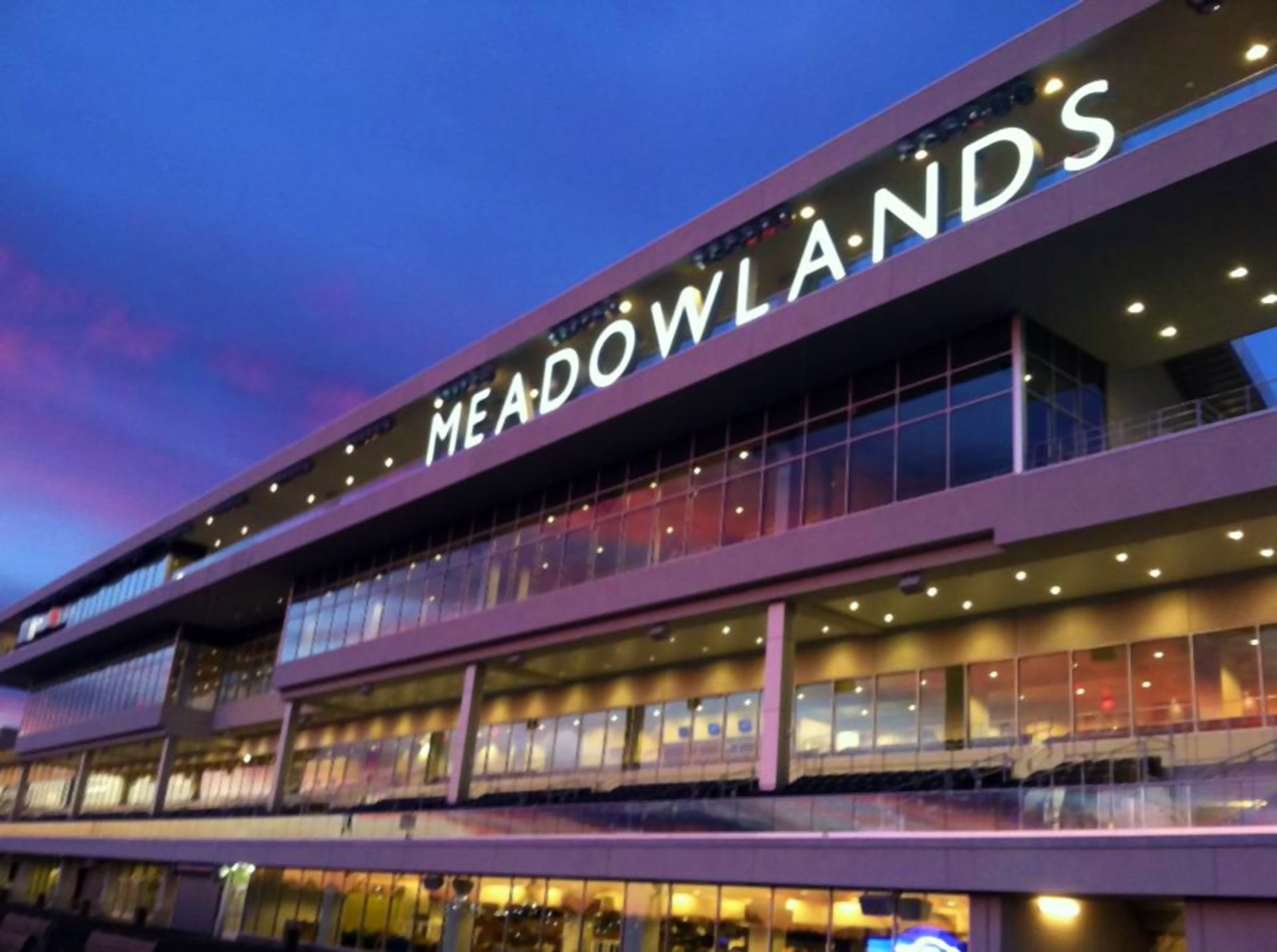
The current Meadowlands Grandstand at Sunset

Like many racecourses in the United States, the main (dirt) track at the Meadowlands has a 1-mile (1,609 m) circumference; inside of this is a turf course (used by the thoroughbreds only) which is 7 furlongs (1,408 m). With a span of exactly 3/16 mile (302 m) from the top of the stretch to the finish line and a distance of exactly 1/16 mile (101 m) from the finish line to the beginning of the first (clubhouse) turn, the dimensions of the track are considered "typical" or "standard" for an American racetrack. The main track is 90 feet (27 m) wide, while the width of the turf course is 80 feet (24 m). The track is equipped to race at night and most of its races are at night.

In the middle of the track is a lake, intended to resemble the state of New Jersey.

The old grandstand, horse barns and site, was designed by the Philadelphia architectural firm of EwingCole (now known as Ewing Cole Cherry Brott), who also designed a number of other track facilities around the world as well as Citizens Bank Park in Philadelphia (with Populous).

The new grandstand opened for simulcasting on Monday, November 18, 2013. The official unveiling of the new grandstand was on November 23, 2013, for first night of live fall harness racing. The collaborative production by managing partner Jeff Gural and The Hard Rock spans 180,000 square feet across four floors and includes a track apron that holds up to 10,000 people. Notable drivers in attendance included John Campbell, Yannick Gingras, Scott Zeron and Tim Tetrick. Famed pacer Gallo Blue Chip kicked off the racing action with a ribbon cutting ceremony across the finish line.

== Accessibility and transportation ==
Like the rest of the sports complex, Meadowlands Racetrack is accessible via Exit 16W on the western spur of the New Jersey Turnpike (I-95) which is located adjacent to NJ Route 3 and NJ Route 120. NJ Transit provides bus service on the 160 from the Port Authority Bus Terminal and the 703 on the Haledon/Paterson/East Rutherford route. NJ Transit also provides rail service on the Meadowlands Rail Line at the Meadowlands station but only for major events such as NFL games, big ticket concerts and soccer matches.

== Racing ==
Up until the 1990s, The Meadowlands held these thoroughbred stakes races, some of which were moved to Monmouth Park:

- Grade III – Meadowlands Cup
- Grade III – Cliff Hanger Stakes
- Grade III – Pegasus Stakes
- Grade III – Violet Handicap
- former Grade III – Morven Stakes

From November until the first Saturday of August, in addition to the Hambletonian and Meadowlands Pace, the Meadowlands Racetrack also hosts a variety of other stakes races for standardbreds:

- Super Bowl (discontinued)
- Escort (discontinued)
- Worldly Beauty (discontinued)
- Charles Singer Memorial (discontinued)
- Burning Point (discontinued)
- Sonsam (discontinued)
- William "Buddy" Gilmour (discontinued)
- Shiaway St. Pat (discontinued)
- Clyde Hirt Stakes (discontinued)
- Reynolds Series
- Simpson Series
- Giant Victory (discontinued)
- Artistic Vision (discontinued)
- Whata Baron (discontinued)
- New Jersey Sire Series
- Graduate Pace & Trot
- Miss Versatility
- Golden Girls
- Del Miller Memorial Trot
- Mistletoe Shalee
- Stanley Dancer Memorial
- William R. Haughton Memorial
- Miss New Jersey
- New Jersey Classic
- Ima Lula (discontinued)
- Duenna
- Townsend Ackerman
- Shady Daisy
- Fresh Yankee
- Lady Liberty
- Sam McKee Memorial (formerly known as U.S. Pacing Championship)
- John Cashman Jr. Memorial
- Jim Doherty Memorial (formerly known as Merrie Annabelle)
- Peter Haughton Memorial
- Cane Pace
- Hambletonian Oaks
- Continental Victory (discontinued)
- TVG Free For All Series
- Tarpot Hap
- The Three Diamonds
- The Goldsmith Maid
- The Valley Victory
- The Governor's Cup

== See also ==
- Gambling in New Jersey
