= Most Happy Fella =

American Standardbred racehorse

- Breed: Standardbred
- Sire: Meadow Skipper
- Grandsire: Dale Frost
- Dam: Laughing Girl
- Damsire: Good Time
- Sex: Stallion
- Foaled: 1967
- Died: 5 December 1983
- Country: United States
- Colour: Bay
- Breeder: Stoner Creek Stud (Norman S. Woolworth & David R. Johnston)
- Owner: Egyptian Acres Stable
- Trainer: Stanley Dancer
- Record: 40:22-10-3
- Earnings: $419,033

Major wins
- Adios Pace (1970); Cane Pace (1970); Little Brown Jug (1970); Messenger Stakes (1970); Shapiro Stakes (1970)

Awards
- 1970 USA 3 Year Old Colt Pacer of the Year & Pacer of the Year; Triple Crown of Harness Racing for Pacers; Leading Standardbred Sire in North America (1979-80)

Honors
- United States Harness Racing Hall of Fame
- Last updated on 31 January 2016

Most Happy Fella (1967–1983) was a bay Standardbred horse by Meadow Skipper. He was voted Pacer of the Year in the United States in 1970 when he won the Triple Crown of Harness Racing for Pacers.

== Racing career ==
As a two-year-old in 1969, Most Happy Fella won several stakes races, including the American-National at Sportsman’s Park

As a three-year-old, Most Happy Fella won the Triple Crown of Harness Racing for Pacers of the Cane Pace, Little Brown Jug and Messenger Stakes. He also won the Adios Pace beating Columbia George in a race-off and the Shapiro Stakes at Hollywood Park At his last race start he finished second behind Laverne Hanover in the American Classic against older pacers.

== Stud record ==
At stud he sired Cam Fella the 1982 and 1983 Harness Horse of the Year and many pacers now trace back to him in their pedigree through, in addition to Cam Fella, his son Oil Burner who sired No Nukes who in turn sired Western Hanover. Jate Lobell, Rocknroll Hanover, Western Ideal and The Panderosa are all sires tracing back to him through his sons. Most Happy Fella was also the sire of $1m earner Troublemaker and notable mares Silk Stockings and Tarport Hap.

Most Happy Fella died in December 1983 aged 16 at Blue Chip Farm where he had stood for his whole stud career. His sons and daughters had earned $55 million at the time of his death which made him the all-time leading sire regardless of breed.

== Sire line tree ==
- Most Happy Fella
  - Oil Burner
    - No Nukes
      - Western Hanover
        - Western Dreamer
        - Western Ideal
          - Always a Virgin
            - Always B Miki
        - The Ponderosa
          - Ponder
            - Bolt The Duer
          - Shadow Play
        - Badlands Hanover
          - Mr Wiggles
          - Wiggle It Jiggleit
        - Georgia Pacific
  - Tyler B
    - Magical Mike
      - Gallo Blue Chip
  - Cam Fella
    - Precious Bunny
    - Cam's Card Shark
      - Bettor's Delight
