= New Jersey Classic Pace =

- Location: East Rutherford, New Jersey
- Inaugurated: 1980
- Race type: Harness race for Standardbred pacers
- Website: Meadowlands Racing & Entertainment

Race information
- Distance: 1 mile (1,609 metres or 8 furlongs)
- Surface: Dirt, 1 mile oval
- Track: Meadowlands Racetrack
- Purse: $150,000 (2016)

The New Jersey Classic is a race for Standardbred racehorses run annually since 1980 at the Meadowlands Racetrack in East Rutherford, New Jersey. Open to New Jersey-sired 3-Year-Old Colt & Gelding pacers, it is run over a distance of one mile.

== Historical race events ==
1981 Classic winner Caramore was bred and owned by Father Thomas J. O'Connor, pastor at St. Robert Bellarmine Catholic Church in Freehold Township, New Jersey who owned and bred more than eighty horses.

== Records ==
Most wins by a driver

- 5 – John Campbell (1980, 1989, 1994, 2006, 2007) & Michel Lachance (1990, 1998, 1999, 2001, 2003)

Most wins by a trainer

- 3 – William G. Robinson (1983, 1993, 1994) & Brett Pelling (1998, 1999, 2005) & James Dean (2011, 2012, 2015)

Stakes record

- 1:47 2/5 – Panther Hanover (2012)

== New Jersey Classic Pace winners ==
Year	Winner	Driver	Trainer	Owner	Time	Purse
2016	Dontcallmefrancis	Yannick Gingras	Ron Burke	Burke Racing Stable LLC, Weaver Bruscemi LLC, Phillip Collura	1:51 0/0	$150,000
2015	Split The House	Randy Waples	James Dean	James Dean, Scott Horner, Peter Milligan	1:48 3/5	$200,000
2014	Sweet Rock	Brett Miller	Wayne Givens	Legacy Racing of DE Inc, Reginald Hazzard II, Gary Calloway	1:49 4/5	$225,000
2013	Lucan Hanover	David Miller	Casie Coleman	West Wins Stable (Ross Warriner), Christine Calhoun	1:48 3/5	$250,000
2012	Panther Hanover	Sylvain Filion	James Dean	James Carr	1:47 2/5	$275,000
2011	Big Jim	Phil Hudon	James Dean	James Carr	1:51 0/0	$400,000
2010	Bg's Folly	Brian Sears	George Berkner	Ginny Berkner, Martin Goldman, Chad Aaron, William Salmeri	1:49 1/5	$500,000
2009	Passmaster Hanover	Tim Tetrick	Blair Burgess	Brittany Farms & Jeffrey S. Snyder	1:50 2/5	$500,000
2008	McCedes	Catello Manzi	Christopher J. Ryder	Christopher J. Ryder & Jerry Silva	1:49 4/5	$500,000
2007	Fresh Deck	John Campbell	Joe Holloway	Val D'or Farms, Ted Gewertz, Schoor-Racing Stable	1:49 4/5	$500,000
2006	Feelin Friskie	John Campbell	Scott Bell	Wayne Whebby	1:49 1/5	$500,000
2005	Rocknroll Hanover	Brian Sears	Brett Pelling	Jeffrey S. Snyder, Lothlorien Equestrian Center (Phyllis A. Campbell)	1:51 0/0	$500,000
2004	Modern Art	David Miller	Joe Holloway	Val D’Or Farms, Milton & Martha Frank, & Ted Gewertz	1:50 2/5	$500,000
2003	Artesian	Michel Lachance	Cosmo De Pinto	Cosmo De Pinto	1:50 4/5	$500,000
2002	McArdle	Catello Manzi	Christopher J. Ryder	Norman & Gerald Smiley, Tip Stables, Sampson Street Stables	1:50 1/5	$500,000
2001	Bettor's Delight	Michel Lachance	Scott McEneny	John B. Grant	1:50 0/0	$500,000
2000	Riverboat King	Jim Morrill, Jr.	Steve Elliott	Paul L. Bordogna	1:50 1/5	$500,000
1999	Art's Conquest	Michel Lachance	Brett Pelling		1:50 0/0	$500,000
1998	Shady Character	Michel Lachance	Brett Pelling	Sanford & Corinne Goldfarb	1:51 1/5	$500,000
1997	Arturo	Luc Ouellette	Steven LeBlanc		1:51 2/5	$500,000
1996	Falcons Scooter	Ray Remmen	Larry Remmen	Leonard Kolschowsky	1:52 0/0	$500,000
1995	Jenna's Beach Boy	William Fahy	Joe Holloway	L&L DeVisser Partnership	1:50 4/5	$500,000
1994	Cam's Card Shark	John Campbell	William G. Robinson	Jeffrey S. Snyder	1:51 0/0	$500,000
1993	Presidential Ball	Ron Waples	William G. Robinson	Antonio Chiaravalle	1:51 4/5	$500,000
1992	Western Hanover	William Fahy	Gene Riegle	George Segal	1:50 4/5	$500,000
1991	Die Laughing	Richard Silverman	Roger Goldstein	Alnoff Stable & Val D'Or Farms	1:51 4/5	$500,000
1990	Too Good	Michel Lachance	Ronald Knigge	Ronald & Constance Knigge	1:52 0/0	$421,970
1989	Dexter Nukes	John Campbell	George Gilmour	Thomas A. Dexter	1:53 2/5	$500,000
1988	Matt's Scooter	William "Buddy" Gilmour	Harry J. Poulton	Gordon & Illa Rumpel, Charles Juravinski	1:52 0/0	$500,000
1987	Jate Lobell	Mark O'Mara	Mark O'Mara	Joe McCluskey & Kentuckiana Farms	1:51 2/5	$500,000
1986	Awesome Almahurst	Michael Gagliardi	Michael Gagliardi	Backcourt Stables, Art Phillips, Larry McAllister, Bob Vinecomb	1:53 3/5	$470,785
1985	Markim's Pride	Bill O'Donnell	Fred Grant	Harold Housman	1:54 0/0	$500,000
1984	On The Road Again	William "Buddy" Gilmour	Harry J. Poulton	Gordon & Illa Rumpel	1:53 3/5	$460,000
1983	Allwin Steady	Bill O'Donnell	William G. Robinson		1:54 4/5	$537,000
1982	Pitt Boy	Jim Doherty	Frank Giangrande	Frank & Judy Giangrande	1:54 4/5	$519,000
1981	Caramore	Catello Manzi	Howard B. Camden	Rev. Fr. Thomas J. O'Connor	1:57 0/0	$265,000
1980	Bold Rush	John Campbell	Fern Paquet	Dr. J. Richard Feldman, et al.	1:55 4/5	$300,000
