= Precious Bunny =

American Standardbred racehorse

- Breed: Standardbred
- Sire: Cam Fella
- Grandsire: Most Happy Fella
- Dam: Bunny's Wish
- Damsire: B G's Bunny
- Sex: Stallion
- Foaled: May 6, 1988
- Country: United States
- Colour: Bay
- Owner: R. Peter Heffering
- Trainer: William G. Robinson
- Record: 39:21-5-4
- Earnings: $2,281,142

Major wins
- North America Cup (1991); Meadowlands Pace (1991); Art Rooney Pace (1991); Adios Pace(1991); Little Brown Jug (1991); Cleveland Classic (1991); NJSS Final (1991); Windy City Pace (1991)

Awards
- American Harness Horse of the Year (1991); Canadian Harness Horse of the Year (1991)

Honors
- Canadian Horse Racing Hall of Fame (2004); United States Harness Racing Hall of Fame (2014)
- Last updated on December 13, 2016

Precious Bunny (May 6, 1988 - April 15, 2015) is a bay Standardbred pacer and sire.

== Background ==
Precious Bunny is a bay horse bred in Cranbury, New Jersey. He was sired by Cam Fella who won the Cane Pace and Messenger Stakes in 1982. His dam Bunny's Wish was a daughter of B Gs Bunny. He was trained to be a harness racer. He was trained by Bill Robinson and usually driven by Jack Moiseyev.

== Racing career ==
In 1990, Precious Bunny ran fourteen times, recording his only success in a New Jersey Sire Stakes.

As a three-year-old in 1991 Precious Bunny won twenty of his twenty-five races. In June, he won the $1 million North America Cup at Greenwood Raceway in June. In the following month he was matched against Artsplace, the leading two-year-old pacer of 1990 in the $1 million Meadowlands Pace at Meadowlands Racetrack. Starting second in the betting, Precious Bunny overtook Artsplace on the backstretch and drew away in the straight to win by two lengths in a time of 1:49.4, one of the fastest times ever recorded in harness racing. He later won the Art Rooney Pace and the Adios Pace.

On September 19 the colt started favorite for the Little Brown Jug at Delaware, Ohio. Racing in front of a record crowd of 52,967 Precious Bunny won his heat in 1:54.1, before winning the final in 1:55.0, beating Nuke Skywalker by three quarters of a length. After the race, Moiseyev said "This is the first time I really started him up that fast. He felt good... He's done everything we have asked him to do and he proved himself today".

In the Autumn of 1991, Precious Bunny added victories in the Cleveland Classic, NJSS final and Windy City Pace.

== Stud record ==
Precious Bunny was retired to stud at Hickory Lane Horse Farm in Findlay, Ohio. He was exported to New Zealand in 2000. He is the sire of Bunny Lake – the United States Harness Horse of the Year in 2001, Precious Delight, Stout, Bunny's Express Lane, and PB Bullville, who set a record for three-year old pacers of 1:48 for the mile.

== Honors ==
Precious Bunny was voted Harness Horse of the Year in 1991. He was elected to the Canadian Horse Racing Hall of Fame in 2004, and the United States Harness Racing Hall of Fame in 2014.

== Pedigree ==
Pedigree of Precious Bunny (USA), bay stallion, 1988
| Sire Cam Fella (USA) 1979 | Most Happy Fella (USA); 1967 | Meadow Skipper | Dale Frost |
| Sire Cam Fella (USA) 1979 | Most Happy Fella (USA); 1967 | Meadow Skipper | Countess Vivian |
| Sire Cam Fella (USA) 1979 | Most Happy Fella (USA); 1967 | Laughing Girl | Good Time |
| Sire Cam Fella (USA) 1979 | Most Happy Fella (USA); 1967 | Laughing Girl | Maxine's Dream |
| Sire Cam Fella (USA) 1979 | Nan Cam (USA); 1971 | Bret Hanover | Adios |
| Sire Cam Fella (USA) 1979 | Nan Cam (USA); 1971 | Bret Hanover | Brenna Hanover |
| Sire Cam Fella (USA) 1979 | Nan Cam (USA); 1971 | Nan Frost | Dale Frost |
| Sire Cam Fella (USA) 1979 | Nan Cam (USA); 1971 | Nan Frost | Mynah Hanover |
| Dam Bunny's Wish (USA) 1982 | B G's Bunny (USA); 1973 | Albatross | Meadow Skipper |
| Dam Bunny's Wish (USA) 1982 | B G's Bunny (USA); 1973 | Albatross | Voodoo Hanover |
| Dam Bunny's Wish (USA) 1982 | B G's Bunny (USA); 1973 | Bret's Romance | Bret Hanover |
| Dam Bunny's Wish (USA) 1982 | B G's Bunny (USA); 1973 | Bret's Romance | Knights Embassy |
| Dam Bunny's Wish (USA) 1982 | Last Wish (USA); 1974 | Romeo Hanover | Dancer Hanover |
| Dam Bunny's Wish (USA) 1982 | Last Wish (USA); 1974 | Romeo Hanover | Romola Hanover |
| Dam Bunny's Wish (USA) 1982 | Last Wish (USA); 1974 | Bye Bye Time | Bye Bye Byrd |
| Dam Bunny's Wish (USA) 1982 | Last Wish (USA); 1974 | Bye Bye Time | High Time |

- Precious Bunny was inbred 3 x 4 to Meadow Skipper and Bret Hanover, meaning that these stallions appear in both the third and fourth generations of his pedigree.
