= Breeders Crown 2YO Colt & Gelding Pace =

- Location: North America
- Inaugurated: 1984 (42 years ago)
- Race type: Harness race for Standardbred pacers
- Website: Hambletonian Society, Inc.

Race information
- Distance: 1 mile (1,609 metres or 8 furlongs)
- Surface: Dirt
- Track: various
- Qualification: 2-year-olds
- Purse: $600,000 (2023)

The Breeders Crown 2YO Colt & Gelding Pace is a harness racing event for two-year-old Standardbred male pacers. It is one part of the Breeders Crown annual series of twelve races for both Standardbred pacers and trotters. First run in 1985, it is contested over a distance of one mile. Race organizers have awarded the event to various racetracks across North America.

== Historical race events ==
In the October 12, 1984 inaugural running of the Breeders Crown pace for two-year-old males, Dragon's Lair scored what is widely regarded as one of the most memorable wins in the series history when he upset the previously undefeated Nihilator in a then world record time of 1:54 1/5.

In 2019, the race's first disqualification of a first-placed horse took place when Papi Rob Hanover was disqualified from and placed second behind Tall Dark Stranger.

In 2020, Perfect Sting and Summa Cum Laude were involved in the race's first dead heat.

== North American locations ==
- Woodbine Racetrack (Wdb) Ontario (9)
- Meadowlands Racetrack (Mxx) New Jersey (7)
- Mohawk Raceway (Moh) Ontario (6)
- Pompano Park (Ppk) Florida (5)
- Harrah's Hoosier Park (HoP) Indiana (3)
- Garden State Park (Gsp) New Jersey (2)
- Pocono Downs (Pcd) Pennsylvania (2)
- Rosecroft Raceway (Rcr) Maryland (2)
- Colonial Downs (Cln) Virginia (1)
- Freehold Raceway (Fhl) New Jersey (1)
- The Meadows Racetrack (Mea) Pennsylvania (1)

== Records ==
Most wins by a driver

- 6 – Ronald Pierce (1998, 2003, 2004, 2008, 2009, 2013)

Most wins by a trainer

- 3 – Robert McIntosh (1986, 1997, 2001)

Stakes record

- 1:49 0/0 – Sweet Lou (2011)

== Winners of the Breeders Crown 2YO Colt & Gelding Pace ==
Year	Winner	Driver	Trainer	Owner	Time	Purse	Track
2023	Gem Quality	Dexter Dunn	Chris Ryder	Brad Grant, Let It Ride Stables, Bottom Line Racing, Enviro Stables	1:50 0/0	$600,000	HoP
2022	Ammo	David Miller	Joe Holloway	Val D'Or Farms, Ted Gewertz	1:50 4/5	$600,000	Moh
2021	Monte Miki	Scott Zeron	Mark Evers	Velocity Standardbreds	1:53 1/5	$600,000	Mxx
2020 (Note: Dead heat.)	Perfect Sting	David Miller	Joe Holloway	Brittany Farms, Val D'Or Farms	1:50 2/5	$600,000	HoP
2020	Summa Cum Laude	Brian Sears	Ron Burke	Burke Racing Stable, Phillip Collura, J&T Silva–Purnel & Libby, Weaver Bruscemi	1:50 2/5	$600,000	HoP
2019	Tall Dark Stranger (Note: Papi Rob Hanover finished first but was disqualified to second for interference against Tall Dark Stranger.)	Yannick Gingras	Nancy Johansson	Crawford Farms, Marvin Katz, Caviart Farms, Howard Taylor	1:51 0/0	$600,000	Moh
2018	Captain Crunch	Scott Zeron	Nancy Johansson	3 Brothers Stables, Christina Takter, Rojan Stables, Caviart Farms	1:51 3/5	$675,000	Pcd
2017	Stay Hungry	Doug McNair	Tony Alagna	Brad Grant, Irwin Samuelman	1:50 4/5	$600,000	HoP
2016	Huntsville	Tim Tetrick	Ray Schnittker	Theodore Gewertz, Charles Iannazzo, Steven Arnold	1:49 1/5	$600,000	Mxx
2015	Boston Red Rocks	Tim Tetrick	Steve Elliott	Peter Blood & Rich Berks	1:51 3/5	$600,000	Wdb
2014	Traceur Hanover	Andy Miller	Corey Johnson	Richard Berthiaume	1:51 0/0	$500,000	Mxx
2013	Luck Be Withyou	Ronald Pierce	Chris Oakes	John H. Craig	1:52 0/0	$500,000	Pcd
2012	Rockin Amadeus	Yannick Gingras	Jimmy Takter	Lothlorien Equine	1:51 2/5	$600,000	Wdb
2011	Sweet Lou	Dave Palone	Ron Burke	Ron Burke, Lawrence Karr, Phillip Collura, Weaver Bruscemi LLC	1:49 0/0	$650,000	Wdb
2010	Big Jim	Phillip Hudon	James Dean	James Carr	1:50 4/5	$600,000	Pcd
2009	All Speed Hanover	Ronald Pierce	Michael Vanderkemp	Adam Victor & Son Stable & John Fielding	1:52 0/0	$700,000	Wdb
2008	Well Said	Ronald Pierce	Steve Elliott	Jeffery S. Snyder & Lothlorien Equine	1:51 0/0	$700,000	Mxx
2007	Santanna Blue Chip	Jody Jamieson	Carl Jamieson	Carl Jamieson, Jeffrey Gillis & George Arthur Stable	1:51 3/5	$650,000	Mxx
2006	Charley Barley	Michel Lachance	Kimberlie Miller	John Ezzo & Lisa Adkins	1:53 3/5	$600,000	Wdb
2005	Jereme's Jet	Paul MacDonell	Tom Harmer	Genesis Racing Stablr	1:52 1/5	$575,400	Mxx
2004	Village Jolt	Ronald Pierce	Edward Hart	Jeffery S. Snyder & Jules & Arlene Siegel	1:51 1/5	$713,200	Wdb
2003	I Am A Fool	Ronald Pierce	Brett Pelling	Perfect Workd Enterprises	1:52 2/5	$590,000	Mxx
2002	Totally Western	Mario Baillargeon	Benjamin Wallace	Benjamin Wallace & Joie de Vie Farm	1:53 2/5	$644,600	Wdb
2001	Western Shooter	John Campbell	Robert McIntosh	Robert McIntosh Stable, CSX & Kohler	1:51 0/0	$670,000	Wdb
2000	Bettor's Delight	Michel Lachance	Scott McEneny	John Grant	1:52 4/5	$627,900	Moh
1999	Tyberwood	Richie Silverman	Gary Machiz	Leon Machiz & Barry Rubenstein	1:52 4/5	$635,100	Moh
1998	Badlands Hanover	Ronald Pierce	Joe Holloway	John Celli	1:50 0/0	$551,700	Cln
1997	Artiscape	Michel Lachance	Robert McIntosh	Brittany Farms & Brian Monieson	1:53 2/5	$567,700	Moh
1996	His Mattjesty	Doug Brown	Stewart Firlotte	The MacDuff Group	1:54 4/5	$592,100	Moh
1995	John Street North	Jack Moiseyev	William Robinson	R. Peter Heffering	1:53 3/5	$550,000	Gsp
1994	Jennas Beach Boy	William Fahy	Joe Holloway	L & L Devisser Partnership	1:51 4/5	$554,300	Wdb
1993	Expensive Scooter	Jack Moiseyev	William Robinson	Marvin Katz & Sam Goldband	1:54 2/5	$300,000	Fhl
1992	Village Jiffy	Ron Walpes	William Wellwood	Wellwood, Armstrong, AFJ, Brunner	1:53 2/5	$300,000	Ppk
1991	Digger Almahurst	Doug Brown	Stew Firlotte	Robert H. Grand Holdings	1:52 1/5	$427,000	Ppk
1990	Artsplace	John Campbell	Gene Riegle	George Segal & Brian Monieson	1:51 1/5	$605,870	Ppk
1989	Till We Meet Again	Myles "Mickey" McNichol	Abe Stotzfus	Ernest W. Hartman	1:56 2/5	$567,213	Ppk
1988	Kentucky Spur	Richard Stillings	Richard Stillings	Roy Davis	1:53 2/5	$661,219	Ppk
1987	Camtastic	Bill O'Donnell	Bob Bencal	Dreamaire Racing Corp III	1:56 2/5	$623,912	Rcr
1986	Sunset Warrior	William Gale	Robert McIntosh	Little Farm	1:55 3/5	$819,600	Gsp
1985	Robust Hanover	John Campbell	Wallace E. Bruce	Wallace E. Bruce & Ronald Knigge	1:56 4/5	$673,553	Rcr
1984	Dragon's Lair	Jeff Mallet	Jeff Mallet	Jeff Mallet, Gary Kornfeld & Harvey Heller	1:54 1/5	$772,500	Mea

== See also ==
- List of Breeders Crown Winners
