= Cam Fella =

American Standardbred racehorse

- Breed: Standardbred
- Sire: Most Happy Fella
- Grandsire: Meadow Skipper
- Dam: Nan Cam
- Damsire: Bret Hanover
- Sex: Ridgling
- Foaled: May 14, 1979
- Died: May 09 2001
- Country: United States
- Colour: Bay
- Breeder: Wilfred Cameron
- Owner: Cam Fella Syndicate
- Trainer: Pat Crowe
- Record: 80:61-9-5
- Earnings: US$2,041,367

Major wins
- Prix d'Été (1982); Confederation Cup Pace (1982); Queen City Pace (1982); Driscoll Series Final (1983); Canadian Pacing Derby (1983); Gold Cup Invitational Pace (1983) U.S. Pacing Triple Crown wins: Messenger Stakes (1982); Cane Pace (1982)

Awards
- Harness Horse of the Year (1982, 1983)

Honors
- U. S. Harness Racing Hall of Fame (1998); Canadian Horse Racing Hall of Fame (1986); Leading Standardbred Sire in North America (1993, 1995)
- Last updated on 2016-11-01

Cam Fella (May 14, 1979 – May 9, 2001) was a bay pacing horse by Most Happy Fella out of Nan Cam by Bret Hanover. He was trained and driven originally by Doug Arthur and later by Pat Crowe. His best time for the mile was 1:53.1. Cam Fella was purchased as a 2-year-old by the two Norms, Norm Clements and Norm Faulkner. He earned the nickname "The Pacing Machine" in a career wherein he became the richest standardbred of all time.

== 1981 season ==
In 1981, as a two-year-old, Cam Fella won three of eleven starts and was sold to Norm Clements and Norm Faulkner for US$140,000 after winning the Valedictory series final in his final start for the year. He earned only $17,588 for the year.

== 1982 season ==
Cam Fella had won 12 of 14 starts for the year, including the Hopeful Pace and New Faces, before his first major win in the Cane Pace as a supplemental entry. In eliminations for the Meadowlands Pace, Cam Fella could finish only seventh and did not progress to the final. It was to be the last time in his career he did not finish in the first three placings.

Although he won the Cane Pace, he did not have an opportunity to take the Triple Crown as he was not eligible to start in the Little Brown Jug. In October he proved himself to be the top 3yo pacer in North America by winning the Messenger Stakes. In the first heat he tied the track record for 3yos, winning in 1.57 3/5, before beating Icarus Lobell and Soky's Atom in the final heat in 1.59 after a mid-race duel with Little Brown Jug winner Merger. As in the Cane Pace, he was a supplemental entry to the Messenger. His final start for 1982 came in November when he won the Provincial Cup at Windsor Raceway in 1.55.4, which tied the track record for his age. It was his 28th win from 33 starts for the year. The track reported its highest attendance since Niatross started there in 1980 and strong wagering, which had become typical for a race night featuring Cam Fella. He also won the Queen City Pace, Prix d'Été, Confederation Cup Pace and Sophomore Pace in Canada and time trialed in 1.54 at The Red Mile. The Prix d'Été was the richest race in Canada at the time. For his exploits Cam Fella was named Harness Horse of the Year in both Canada and the United States for a season in which he started 33 times for 28 wins and 2 second places and had earnings of $879,723.

== 1983 season ==
After a slow start to 1983, Cam Fella won two of three legs of the World Cup series at The Meadowlands, including a two-length win in the final in 1.55 on a wet track. Once Cam Fella began winning in 1983, he continued winning until the end of his career at season's end by going on a 28-race unbeaten streak. During the streak he won the Graduate and Driscoll Finals at The Meadowlands, the Canadian Pacing Derby, American National, Stewart Fraser Memorial, Frank Ryan Memorial, Blue Bonnets Challenge, Gold Cup and all three legs of the US Pacing Championship. In the Summer Championship at The Meadowlands in July, It's Fritz was given a strong chance of beating Cam Fella by bettors; however, Cam Fella won in 1.54.2, ending a five-race winning sequence for his opponent. His wins in the US Pacing Championship leg and American National both broke the Sportsman's Park track record, and his win in the US Pacing Championship leg at Roosevelt Raceway set a track record of 1.56.2. By the end of 1983, Cam Fella had won 30 of 36 starts for the year and was voted Harness Horse of the Year for a second time. His final start came at Greenwood Raceway, Toronto, in December. It was his 28th consecutive win. 1983 Mohawk Raceway Horse Named: PERFECT OUT, Beats CAM FELLA. Refer To YouTube Video!

== Stud career ==
Cam Fella began stud duty in 1984 and had an illustrious career siring 1,002 foals who earned $106.7m in prize money. His offspring included such notable horses as Eternal Camnation, Presidential Ball, Precious Bunny, Cam's Card Shark and Camluck, all of whom have been inducted into the Living Hall of Fame or elected as Hall of Fame Immortals, as well as $2m earners Goalie Jeff and Camtastic and fastest Standardbred of all time Cambest. He was the leading sire in North America in 1993 and 1995, and his son Camluck and grandson Bettor's Delight (by Cam's Card Shark) have both also been the leading sire.

Cam Fella was a ridgling, meaning he had only one descended testicle, and his stud career ended when he was gelded as a result of testicular cancer. Following his stud career, he was taken on a tour of racetracks to raise money for charity, drawing large crowds. He was euthanized on May 9, 2001. A small residential street in Toronto near the former Greenwood Raceway is named "Cam Fella Lane" in his honour.

== Sire line tree ==
- Cam Fella
  - Precious Bunny
  - Cam's Card Shark
    - Bettor's Delight
