= Earle Avery =

Canadian racehorse driver and trainer

Personal information
- Born: February 4, 1894 Knowlesville, New Brunswick, Canada
- Died: November 6, 1977 (aged 83) Woodstock, New Brunswick, Canada
- Occupations: Harness racing driver, trainer, owner

Horse racing career
- Sport: Horse racing
- Career wins: 4,000+ (includes 1,252 USTA)

Major racing wins
- American Pacing Classic (1955, 1964); Empire Pace (1959); Hudson Filly Trot (1961); Lady Suffolk Filly Trot (1961); American Trotting Championship (1962); Poplar Hill Stakes (1963); American Trotting Classic (1963); Hempt Memorial (1965); Bluegrass Stakes (1966) U.S. Pacing Triple Crown wins: William H. Cane Futurity (1963)

Racing awards
- Grand Circuit Award of Merit Medal (1972)

Honours
- New Brunswick Sports Hall of Fame (1976); Canadian Horse Racing Hall of Fame (1977); United States Harness Racing Hall of Fame (1978)

Significant horses
- Meadow Skipper, Egyptian Princess, Muncy Hanover, Porterhouse, Gun Runner
- Updated on October 9, 2016

Earl(e) Bradford Avery (February 4, 1894 – November 6, 1977) was a driver and trainer of standardbred racehorses who was inducted into both the Canadian and United States Harness Racing Halls of Fame.

== Racing career ==
He earned his first win on August 19, 1919, at Island Park race track in Woodstock, New Brunswick. Although he would become very successful racing in his native New Brunswick and at New England tracks, Avery would continue to personally operate his 600-acre potato farm for the next 29 years. In 1948 he relocated to the United States to pursue a career in racing on a full-time basis. In 1951 he was the leading driver at Laurel Raceway in Maryland. Having worked off and on for a number of years for Norman Woolworth's Clearview Farm, in 1955 he accepted Woolworth's offer to take over as full-time head trainer and driver. While Avery had success with many horses during his seventeen years with Woolworth's stable, the best was the great runner and outstanding sire, Meadow Skipper.

== Retirement ==
Following Earle Avery's announcement that he would be retiring from racing in October 1972, he was honored by the racing community and its fans with an Earle Avery Night at Yonkers Raceway. He retired to his hometown in New Brunswick where he died at age 83 in 1977.
