= Vernon Dancer =

American harness racing driver (1923–2000)

Personal information
- Born: Vernon John Dancer; August 3, 1923 Red Valley, New Jersey, U.S.
- Died: September 5, 2000 (aged 77) Philadelphia, Pennsylvania, U.S.
- Occupations: Harness racing driver; horse trainer
- Years active: 1952-1977

Horse racing career
- Sport: Harness racing
- Career winnings: $8.96 million
- Career wins: 1,723

Major racing wins
- Yonkers Trot (1970); Cane Pace (1973)

Honors
- United States Harness Racing Hall of Fame (2001)

Significant horses
- Victory Star

Vernon Dancer (August 3, 1923 – September 5, 2000) was an American harness racing driver and horse trainer.

== Early life ==
Vernon John Dancer was born in Red Valley, New Jersey, United States, on August 3, 1923.

His parents were James and Helen Dancer. He was an older brother of famed harness racer Stanley Dancer.

== Career ==
=== Farming career ===
As a youth, he became a member of the Monmouth County 4-H dairy club in the mid-1930s. His registered Guernsey cow, Hillbreeze Adonis Seven, produced over 500 pounds of fat as a two-year-old in 1940, earning him recognition and production awards in 1941 and 1942.

In 1944, he purchased 190 acres of farmland from his father for $10,000. He sold 95 acres to his brother Stanley in 1947 for $5,000, who built a house, a training track, and horse barns while he farmed tomatoes and potatoes. He found success as a farmer in New Jersey. He established the Vernon J. Dancer Farm on Archtown Road in New Egypt, directly across from his brother Stanley's Egyptian Acres.

Although he was exposed to harness racing through his brother, Dancer remained primarily a farmer until the mid-1950s. He transitioned full-time into harness racing in 1956. He left behind farming his 95-acre property to concentrate on horse training and racing.

=== Racing career ===
He was taught driving and horse care by his younger brother Stanley and supported him in training his stable for three years. At his brother's suggestion, he purchased Miss Norah with equipment, including a harness and sulky, for $1,000. Dancer debuted with Miss Norah at Freehold Raceway in New Jersey in 1952.

Throughout the 1950s and 1960s, he established a large harness racing stable across the East Coast circuit. He entered the top 25 in earnings and dash wins in 1959 and stayed on the money list every year afterward, frequently placing near the top in race victories. In 1963, he established a track record at Monticello Raceway with Lyss Hanover. At Yonkers Raceway on July 16, 1964, he guided Cardigan Bay past Overtrick in the Dan Patch Pace, winning in a track and world record performance of 1:58.1.

Dancer finished as the top driver at Roosevelt Raceway in 1966 and again led at Liberty Bell Park Racetrack during the spring of 1967. He drove Peerswick to the first sub-2:00 mile in the history of Freehold Raceway on August 12, 1967. The following year, he crossed the 1,000-win milestone and had already banked over $6 million in career winnings.

He became one of the most successful contract trainers in the United States. He was noted for developing top trotters. In the 1968 season, he began training Tempered Yankee, the notable pacer who scored victories over Rum Customer, Fulla Napoleon, Laverne Hanover, and Sunnie Tar.

During the 1969 Grand Circuit, Dancer piloted Victory Star, whom he broke, trained, and drove to honors as the season's leading two-year-old trotting colt and top-earning juvenile. He drove the three-year-old to win the $100,000 Yonkers Trot. Dancer finished second in the 1970 Hambletonian Stakes with Victory Star.

He developed Honeysuckle Rose, one of his best-known horses, a multiple stakes winner that never broke stride in her career. He prepared the trotting filly for Dr. Field and Dr. Philip Chapalis as a contender for the Hambletonian. Before the race, she ranked as the top three-year-old filly in the country. He drove her in his third Hambletonian appearance at the DuQuoin State Fairgrounds Racetrack in 1973.

He also served as a substitute driver for his brother Stanley's stable. In 1971, he was the driver of Super Bowl, before his brother Stanley's Trotting Triple Crown campaign with the colt. He drove the two-year-old trotter to a world-record mile of 2:01 4/5 on a 5/8-mile track at Liberty Bell Park. Dancer also drove Smog to victory in the 1973 Cane Pace at Yonkers Raceway while his brother recovered from a back disc issue.

Dancer continued competing at a high level through the mid-1970s. In the 51st Hambletonian Stakes in 1976, he took one of the heats with Zoot Suit.

His driving career was cut short after he suffered several broken bones in his leg during a 1977 accident at Freehold Raceway. Over his career, he amassed 1,723 wins, $8.96 million in earnings, and a 0.395 winning percentage.

In 1997, he played an important part in defeating a New Jersey tax ruling that would have imposed major costs on owners and trainers of Standardbred and Thoroughbred horses across the state.

== Personal life ==
A native of Red Valley, Dancer spent his life in New Egypt, New Jersey and married Carolyn Bell. He had two sons: Vernon E. and Donald Dancer.

== Death ==
Vernon J. Dancer died at age 77 on September 5, 2000, in Philadelphia, Pennsylvania. He passed away at the Hospital of the University of Pennsylvania and was buried in Jacobstown Cemetery.

== Legacy ==
Dancer was inducted into the U.S. Harness Racing Hall of Fame in 2001.
