= Tiger Tara =

New Zealand Standardbred racehorse

- Breed: Standardbred
- Sire: Bettor's Delight (USA)
- Grandsire: Cam's Card Shark (USA)
- Dam: Tara Gold
- Maternal grandsire: Dream Away (USA)
- Sex: Stallion
- Foaled: 23 October 2010
- Country: New Zealand
- Colour: Bay
- Breeder: R P Anicich, NZ
- Owner: M Hawli, Ms C L Pizzuto, K J Pizzuto, Mrs T N Pizzuto
- Trainer: (1) Geoff Dunn (2) Kevin Pizzuto

Major wins
- 2018 Inter Dominion Pacing Championship; 2019 A G Hunter Cup

Awards
- 2019 Australian Harness Horse of the Year

Tiger Tara (foaled 23 October 2010) is a New Zealand bred Standardbred racehorse that raced at the very top level in both New Zealand and Australia.

He is notable in that he was voted Australian Harness Horse of the Year for the 2019 season and he won seven Group 1 races, including the Inter Dominion Pacing Championship which is raced between the best horses in Australasia.

== Racing career ==
Tiger Tara was originally trained in Canterbury, New Zealand, by Geoff Dunn and driven in all his wins during that time by Gerard O'Reilly. He was later sold and exported to Australian owners and trained by Kevin Pizzuto and driven by Todd McCarthy.

=== Notable performances ===
Year	Placing	Race	1st	2nd	3rd
2013	1st	New Zealand Sires Stakes 3yo Final	Tiger Tara	Better Offer	Isaiah
2014	1st	Great Northern Derby	Tiger Tara	Locharburn	Maxim
2015	1st	New Zealand Free For All	Tiger Tara	Mossdale Conner	Messini
2016	2nd	New Zealand Trotting Cup	Lazarus	Tiger Tara	Titan Banner
2017	3rd	New Zealand Trotting Cup	Lazarus	Jack's Legend	Tiger Tara
2018	1st	Victoria Cup	Tiger Tara	Chicago Bull	Carlas Pixel
2018	2nd	New Zealand Trotting Cup	Thefixer	Tiger Tara	Dream About Me
2018	1st	Inter Dominion Pacing Championship	Tiger Tara	Our Uncle Sam	Cruz Bromac
2019	1st	A G Hunter Cup	Tiger Tara	Our Uncle Sam	San Carlo

Tiger Tara retired in December 2019 with a record of 112 starts for 37 wins, 40 placings and $2,375,065 in earnings.

== Stud career ==
After retiring from the track, Tiger Tara commenced stud duties at Yirribee Pacing Stud, North Wagga for an initial fee of $3,500.

== See also ==
- Harness racing in New Zealand
- Harness racing in Australia
