= Sweet Lou =

Sweet Lou may refer to:

- Sweet Lou (album), a 1974 album by jazz saxophonist Lou Donaldson
- Sweet Lou (horse) (foaled 2009)

== People with the nickname ==
- Lou Amundson (born 1982), former NBA basketball player
- Lou Hudson (1944–2014), former All-Star basketball player
- Louis Dunbar (born 1953), basketball player for the Harlem Globetrotters
- Lou Johnson (1934–2020), Major League Baseball player
- Lou Piniella (born 1943), Major League Baseball manager and player
- Lou Williams (born 1986), NBA basketball player
- Lou Whitaker (born 1957), Major League Baseball player
- Lou Singer, a main character in the 2003 movie Grind
