= Woodrow Wilson Pace =

- Location: Meadowlands Racing & Entertainment; East Rutherford, New Jersey; U.S.
- Inaugurated: 1977 (49 years ago)
- Final run: 2012 (14 years ago)
- Race type: Standardbred (Pace)
- Website: playmeadowlands.com

Race information
- Distance: 1 mile (8.0 furlongs)
- Surface: Dirt
- Track: Left-handed
- Qualification: 2-Year-Olds
- Purse: $309,050 (2012)

The Woodrow Wilson Pace was a harness racing major event for two-year-old Standardbred pacers run from 1977 through 2012 at the Meadowlands Racetrack in East Rutherford, New Jersey.

First run in 1977 for a purse of $280,000, by 1980 the purse was $2,011,000, making it the richest race of any breed in horse racing history.

== Historical race events ==
No No Yankee won the inaugural running of the Woodrow Wilson Pace and went on to earn American Champion Two-Year-Old Male Pacer honors.

In 1984, the undefeated Nihilator won what would be the richest Woodrown Wilson Pace with a purse of $2,161,000. His winning time for the mile of 1:52 4/5 set a world record for 2-year-old Standardbred horses.

== Records ==
Most wins by a driver

- 5 – John Campbell (1988, 1993, 1994, 1997, 2001)

Most wins by a trainer

- 2 – Joe Holloway (1992, 2003), Jim Campbell (1997, 2010), Robert McIntosh (1999, 2001), George Teague, Jr. (2005, 2009), Tony Alagna (2011, 2012)

Stakes record

- 1:49 3/5 – Captaintreacherous (2012)

== Winners of the Woodrow Wilson Pace ==
Year	Winner	Driver	Trainer	Owner	Time	Purse
2012	Captaintreacherous	Tim Tetrick	Tony Alagna	Brittany Farms, Marvin Katz, Joe Sbrocco, White Birch Farm	1:49 3/5	$309,050
2011	Major Bombay	Brian Sears	Tony Alagna	Aaron Waxman, Louis Willinger, John Fodera, Major Bombay Partners	1:51 3/5	$317,800
2010	Fashion Delight	David Miller	Jim Campbell	Fashion Farms	1:51 0/0	$473,000
2009	Windfall Blue Chip	Brian Sears	George Teague, Jr.	George Teague, Jr., Kovach Stables LLC, Theodore Gewertz	1:51 4/5	$455,400
2008	Major In Art	Brian Sears	Justin Lebo	Chester & Justin Lebo	1:50 4/5	$350,000
2007	Dali	Luc Ouellette	Duane Marfisi	Uncirculated Stables (Aaron & Isaac Waxman)	1:50 2/5	$415,000
2006	Fox Valley Barzgar	Tony Morgan	Thomas Harmer	Michael Polansky	1:50 2/5	$410,000
2005	Western Ace	Ronald Pierce	George Teague, Jr.	Teague, Inc. & Kovach Stables	1:51 2/5	$375,000
2004	Village Jolt	Ronald Pierce	Edward Hart	Jeffery S. Snyder & Jules & Arlene Siegel	1:51 3/5	$432,000
2003	Modern Art	David Miller	Joe Holloway	Val D'Or Farms, Ted Gewertz, Milton & Martha Frank	1:51 3/5	$640,000
2002	Allamerican Native	George Brennan	Salvatore Capone	David Scharf, A&G Stables, Jerry Silva	1:51 1/5	$650,000
2001	Allamerican Ingot	John Campbell	Robert McIntosh	Robert Waxman	1:51 3/5	$700,000
2000	Whitefish Falls †	Catello Manzi	Mervin Burke		1:52 0/0	$703,000
1999	Richess Hanover	Michel Lachance	Robert McIntosh	Robert Waxman	1:53 0/0	$600,000
1998	Grinfromeartoear	Luc Ouellette	Monte Gelrod	Perfect World Enterprises	1:52 3/5	$660,250
1997	Real Artist	John Campbell	Jim Campbell	Fashion Farms (Arlene & Jules Siegel)	1:52 0/0	$765,750
1996	Jeremys Gambit	Michel Lachance	Noel Daley	Steven Burn & Martin Cornick	1:52 4/5	$800,000
1995	A Stud Named Sue	George Brennan	Liz Quesnel	Liz Quesnel & Bud Burke, et al.	1:52 4/5	$585,500
1994	Dontgetinmyway	John Campbell	William Robinson	Guida Stables & Joan Goldsmith	1:53 4/5	$774,750
1993	Magical Mike	John Campbell	Thomas Haughton	Shadow Lane Farm & David McDuffee	1:51 4/5	$747,700
1992	America's Pastime	Wally Hennessey	Joe Holloway	Robert J. Suslow	1:51 4/5	$778,800
1991	Sportsmaster	Ron Waples	John F. Simpson, Jr.	Lon Frocione	1:52 1/5	$889,000
1990	Die Laughing	Richard Silverman	Jerry Silverman	Alnoff Stable & Val D'Or Farms	1:52 1/5	$1,043,500
1989	Sam Francisco Ben	Ronald Pierce	Kelvin Harrison	Judith & Irving Levit	1:56 0/0	$907,000
1988	Kassa Branca	John Campbell	William Popfinger	Douglas A. Rass	1:52 3/5	$1,041,000
1987	Even Odds	Ben Webster	Steve Elliot	Arlene Traub	1:54 1/5	$1,422,500
1986	Cullin Hanover	Buddy Gilmour	Richard Thomas	Bert Seltzberg, Don Baker & Mike Grossman	1:54 4/5	$1,561,000
1985	Grade One	Ray Remmen	Lee Broglio	Richard M. Schwartz	1:54 3/5	$1,344,000
1984	Nihilator	Bill O'Donnell	Ernie Gaskin	Wall Street Stable (Louis P. Guida et al.)	1:52 4/5	$2,161,000
1983	Carls Bird	Carl E. Allen	Carl E. Allen	Carl E. Allen	1:55 3/5	$1,700,000
1982	Fortune Teller	Eldon Harner	Eldon Harner	Max Buran, Stanley Becker	1:55 3/5	$1,957,500
1981	McKinzie Almahurst	Billy Haughton	Billy Haughton	5 Guys and Me	1:56 1/5	$1,760,000
1980	Land Grant	Del Insko	Del Insko	Yizhar Glaser & Stephen Lang	1:56 4/5	$2,011,000
1979	Niatross	Clint Galbraith	Clint Galbraith	Harold Graham & Elsie Berger	1:55 4/5	$862,750
1978	Scarlet Skipper	William Herman	William Herman	Frank Perry, Bill Camp, Jr., John F. Simpson Jr.	1:57 3/5	$481,250
1977	No No Yankee	Walter Ross	Peter Blood	Peter Blood, Roger Slobody, Gary Piontkiowski	1:57 4/5	$280,000

- † 2000: Ameripan Gigolo finished first but was disqualified for interference and set back to 10th place.
