= Meadow Skipper =

American Standardbred racehorse

- Breed: Standardbred
- Sire: Dale Frost
- Grandsire: Hal Dale
- Dam: Countess Vivian
- Damsire: Kings Council
- Sex: Stallion
- Foaled: May 8, 1960
- Country: USA
- Colour: Brown
- Breeder: Christy S. Hayes (Columbus, Ohio)
- Owner: Norman S. Woolworth
- Trainer: Earle Avery
- Earnings: $428,057

Major wins
- Cane Pace (1963); American Pacing Classic (1964)

Honours
- United States Harness Racing Hall of Fame (1983)

Meadow Skipper (May 8, 1960 – 1982) was a Standardbred racehorse and sire. He earned $428,057 as a racehorse.

== Background ==
Meadow Skipper was a brown horse foaled in 1960 by Dale Frost out of the U. S. Harness Racing Hall of Fame mare Countess Vivian by Kings Council.

== Career ==
Trained and driven by Earle Avery, Meadow Skipper was a world or season champion during each year that he raced. He won the 1963 Cane Pace, and placed second in the Little Brown Jug.

== Stud record ==
When he retired to the breeding farm, Meadow Skipper sired more than 1,700 progeny. As a stud, his progeny earned $66 million. He sired 456 two-minute pacers, including Triple Crown winners Ralph Hanover and Most Happy Fella; plus Albatross, sire of Niatross, Chairmanoftheboard, and Naughty But Nice.

The winnings of the 2,546 progeny of Albatross, Meadow Skipper's son, earned $130,700,280. Niatross is believed by many to be the greatest harness horse of all time. He was Harness Horse of the Year as a two- and three-year-old in 1979 and 1980, won the Triple Crown of Harness Racing for Pacers, and obliterated the world record by three full seconds with a mile time of 1:49.1.

== Retirement ==
Meadow Skipper retired to Stoner Creek Farm in Kentucky, and died there in 1982. In 1983, Meadow Skipper was inducted into the United States Harness Racing Hall of Fame.

== Sire line tree ==
- Meadow Skipper
  - Most Happy Fella
    - Oil Burner
      - No Nukes
        - Western Hanover
    - Tyler B
      - Magical Mike
        - Gallo Blue Chip
    - Cam Fella
      - Precious Bunny
      - Cam's Card Shark
        - Bettor's Delight
  - Albatross
    - Niatross
      - Nihilator
  - Ralph Hanover

== Pedigree ==
Pedigree of Meadow Skipper (USA), Standardbred brown, 1960
Sire Dale Frost (1951) p,1:58m; $204,117	Hal Dale (1926) p,6,2:02¼m; $595	Abbedale (1917) p,2:01¼m	The Abbe (1903) p,2:04
Sire Dale Frost (1951) p,1:58m; $204,117	Hal Dale (1926) p,6,2:02¼m; $595	Abbedale (1917) p,2:01¼m	Daisydale D. (1908)
Sire Dale Frost (1951) p,1:58m; $204,117	Hal Dale (1926) p,6,2:02¼m; $595	Margaret Hal (1914) p,2,2:19¼	Argot Hal (1903); 2:07½m p,11,T2:04¾m
Sire Dale Frost (1951) p,1:58m; $204,117	Hal Dale (1926) p,6,2:02¼m; $595	Margaret Hal (1914) p,2,2:19¼	Margaret Polk (1906)
Sire Dale Frost (1951) p,1:58m; $204,117	Galloway (1939) p,2:04.4h; $5,294	Raider (1929) p,1:59½m	Peter Volo (1911); 4,2:02m; $44,536
Sire Dale Frost (1951) p,1:58m; $204,117	Galloway (1939) p,2:04.4h; $5,294	Raider (1929) p,1:59½m	Nelda Dillon (1920)
Sire Dale Frost (1951) p,1:58m; $204,117	Galloway (1939) p,2:04.4h; $5,294	Bethel (1926)	David Guy (1915); 3,2:05¼m
Sire Dale Frost (1951) p,1:58m; $204,117	Galloway (1939) p,2:04.4h; $5,294	Bethel (1926)	Annotation (1914) p,2,2:18¼h
Dam Countess Vivian (1950) p,3,1:59m; $43,262	Kings Council (1940) p,6,1:58m; $44,930	Volomite (1926); 3,2:03¼m; $32,649	Peter Volo (1911); 4,2:02m; $44,536
Dam Countess Vivian (1950) p,3,1:59m; $43,262	Kings Council (1940) p,6,1:58m; $44,930	Volomite (1926); 3,2:03¼m; $32,649	Cita Frisco (1921)
Dam Countess Vivian (1950) p,3,1:59m; $43,262	Kings Council (1940) p,6,1:58m; $44,930	Margaret Spangler (1918) p,2:02¼	Guy Axworthy (1902); 4,T2:08¾m
Dam Countess Vivian (1950) p,3,1:59m; $43,262	Kings Council (1940) p,6,1:58m; $44,930	Margaret Spangler (1918) p,2:02¼	Maggie Winder (1906) p,3,2:06¼m
Dam Countess Vivian (1950) p,3,1:59m; $43,262	Filly Direct (1941) p,3,2:06¾h; $6,299	Billy Direct (1934) p,4,T1:55m; $12,040	Napoleon Direct (1909) p,1:59¾m
Dam Countess Vivian (1950) p,3,1:59m; $43,262	Filly Direct (1941) p,3,2:06¾h; $6,299	Billy Direct (1934) p,4,T1:55m; $12,040	Gay Forbes (1916) p,5,2:18¾
Dam Countess Vivian (1950) p,3,1:59m; $43,262	Filly Direct (1941) p,3,2:06¾h; $6,299	Calumet Edna (1931) p,2:19¾h	Peter the Brewer (1918); 4,2:02½
Dam Countess Vivian (1950) p,3,1:59m; $43,262	Filly Direct (1941) p,3,2:06¾h; $6,299	Calumet Edna (1931) p,2:19¾h	Broncho Queen (1916) p,2:09¼h
