= Shady Character =

American Standardbred racehorse

Shady Character (foaled May 4, 1995 in Ohio) is a Standardbred pacing stallion owned by Sanford and Corinne Goldfarb and trained by Brett Pelling. He was sired by Falcon Seelster, a world record holder for all ages over one mile. At age two, Shady Character won the 1997 Historic Goshen Cup two-year-old colt division but is best known for his performances in 1998 when he won two legs of the U.S. Pacing Triple Crown series, the Little Brown Jug and the Cane Pace. Among his other wins that year were the Art Rooney Pace and New Jersey Classic Pace.

Shady Character retired from racing with earnings of $1,225,905. Sent to stand at stud, he had only modest success. From a limited number of offspring, his son Future Character was his top earner with $534,426.
