= Jate Lobell =

American-bred Standardbred racehorse

- Breed: Standardbred
- Sire: No Nukes
- Grandsire: Oil Burner
- Dam: J. R. Amy
- Damsire: Blaze Pick
- Sex: Stallion
- Foaled: 1984
- Died: 2015
- Country: United States
- Colour: Bay
- Breeder: Lana Lobell Farms
- Owner: Joe M. McCluskey
- Trainer: Mark O'Mara
- Record: p,2,1:53; 3,1:51.2
- Earnings: $2,231,402

Awards
- 2-year-old Pacer of the Year (1986); 3-year-old Pacer of the Year (1987)

Honours
- United States Harness Racing Hall of Fame (2004)

Jate Lobell (1984 – 2015) was an American standardbred pacer who was inducted into the United States Harness Racing Hall of Fame in 2004.

== Origin and early years ==
Jate Lobell's breeder was Lana Lobell Farms in New Jersey, United States.

Foaled in 1984, he was sired by No Nukes (by Oil Burner) out of J. R. Amy (by Blaze Pick), with ancestry tracing to the famed Dan Patch. The tight, muscular colt was named after Jate Connor, the son of Lana Lobell Farms manager J. T. Connor.

He was owned by Joe M. McCluskey, a bowling alley proprietor from Battle Creek, Michigan. The No Nukes colt was purchased by McCluskey at the annual Harrisburg horse sale in October 1985. McCluskey used winnings from his racing mare Annie's Surprise to buy the yearling at Garden State Park.

Jate Lobell was broken by Frank O'Mara in Florida in December 1985 and then sent to Judy and Henry Lunsford in Harrodsburg for early training.

== Racing career ==
The racehorse, owned by Joe McCluskey, was later trained and driven in the sulky by Mark O'Mara. At Maywood Park, O'Mara trained Jate Lobell behind the starting gate. Jate Lobell began his juvenile campaign in 1986 at the Chicago track.

=== Two-year-old season ===
As a juvenile, Jate Lobell posted an unbeaten 15-race season. His breakthrough on the Grand Circuit came August 13, 1986, when he won the $100,000 Review Futurity at Springfield, Illinois in straight heats, clocking 1:53 3/5. After his Springfield win, he claimed victories in the $195,000 Fox Stake in Indianapolis and the $435,000 Kentucky Pacing Derby at Louisville Downs. The colt paced the mile in 1:55 2/5 at the Kentucky Pacing Derby, tying the half-mile-track world record for 2-year-olds and taking home $204,785. He added the $106,000 American National in Chicago to his victories on September 13, 1986.

At Lexington's The Red Mile on September 23, 1986, Jate Lobell won the $104,350 International Stallion Stake in 1:53 on an off track, missing Nihilator's two-year-old record by only a fifth of a second.

On October 4 at Freehold, he won an elimination race in 1:56, a track record for 2-year-old pacing colts. It was his fourteenth straight win and the fourth consecutive track record he broke, netting $7,500. He wrapped up a perfect 15-for-15 freshman campaign on October 11, 1986, with a victory in Freehold Raceway's Lou Babic Memorial Stake. With the win, his season earnings for Joe McCluskey reached $585,804.

His undefeated record secured a $12 million syndication, with Tom Crouch of Kentuckiana Farms in Georgetown, Kentucky acquiring 25%. Jate Lobell was slated to cover 135 mares in 1988.

=== Three-year-old season ===
His 1987 season began May 1 in the New Jersey Sire Stakes' opening leg for 3-year-old pacing colts. Jate Lobell's 19-race winning streak ended on May 22, 1987, with his first career loss in the New Jersey Sires Stakes at the New Jersey Meadowlands, which he later avenged. By June 1987, Jate Lobell had 19 wins in 20 starts, his only loss coming to Run the Table.

He captured the American National Stake for 3-year-olds at Sportsman's Park on July 3, 1987, earning $353,700 with a 1:53 track record. When Jate Lobell won the 1987 North America Cup, Canada's first million-dollar harness race at Toronto's Greenwood Raceway, he became the 10th richest pacer of all time. With his 22nd win in 23 races, Jate Lobell's $500,000 winner's share increased his career earnings to $1.475 million, edging out Frugal Gourmet by a nose in 1:52 3/5.

By July 1987, the 3-year-old bay colt had won 23 of 25 races, including a run of 18 straight, earning over $1,600,000 and the title "Jate the Great."

He raced in the Messenger Stakes at Roosevelt Raceway in Westbury, New York in October 1987.

During the 1987 season, the world champion colt won 15 of 25 starts, had seven second-place and two third-place finishes, and led the sport with $1,645,598 in earnings. He wrapped up his career with third-place finishes in both heats of the Breeders Crown at Pompano Park.

Jate Lobell's 30 victories in 40 races earned him $2,231,402, yet he is most celebrated as a top sire and broodmare sire.

== Stud record ==
Beginning in 1988, Jate Lobell stood at stud at Kentuckiana Farms for 22 years until retiring in 2009. As a broodmare sire, his progeny earned more than $205 million, featuring 67 in 1:50, 977 in 1:55, and 553 winners over $100,000, including 12 millionaires.

== Death ==
Jate Lobell died in September 2015, at age 31.

== Legacy ==
During the 1986 season, he broke two world records and four track records. Jate Lobell became the first top 2-year-old to finish undefeated since Niatross's 13-for-13 season in 1979. Early comparisons were drawn to the legendary pacers Niatross and Nihilator. For the 1986 American Harness Horse of the Year, 2-year-old Jate Lobell placed second to 4-year-old Forrest Skipper. He received the award for 2-year-old pacing colt of the year. The United States Harness Writers Association named him 3-year-old colt Pacer of the Year in 1987.

Jate Lobell was inducted into the United States Harness Racing Hall of Fame as a racehorse and stallion in 2004.

== See also ==
- List of racehorses
