= Queen City Pace =

- Location: Toronto, Ontario, Canada
- Inaugurated: 1964
- Race type: Harness race for Standardbred pacers
- Website: Woodbine Entertainment Group

Race information
- Distance: 1 mile (1,609 metres or 8 furlongs)
- Surface: Dirt, 5/8 mile oval
- Track: Greenwood Raceway
- Qualification: 3 year olds
- Purse: $300,000 (2016)

The Queen City Pace was a Canadian harness race for three-year-old Standardbred pacers run each year at Greenwood Raceway in Toronto, Ontario, except in 1978 where it was run at Mohawk Racetrack. The Queen City Pace was run from 1964 through 1983 after which it was replaced by the North America Cup.

== Historical race events ==
The race was run in two divisions in 1974 and 1975. In 1983, that year's race, which would be the last Queen City Pace, was won by Ralph Hanover who went on to win the U.S. Pacing Triple Crown.

== Distances ==
- 1964 - 1 1/16 miles
- 1965 - 1/ 1/8 miles
- 1966-1983 - 1 mile

== Records ==
Most wins by a driver

- 2 – Joe O'Brien (1973, 1974) & Ron Waples (1979, 1983)

Most wins by a trainer

- 8 – Billy Haughton (1968, 1975, 1976, 1980)

Stakes record

- 1:56 flat – Cam Fella (1982)

== Queen City Pace winners ==
Year	Winner	Driver	Trainer	Owner	Time	Purse
1983	Ralph Hanover	Ron Waples	Stewart Firlotte	Waples Stable, Inc., Pointsetta Stables, Inc., Grants Direct Stable	1:56 3/5	$390,000
1982	Cam Fella	Pat Crowe	Pat Crowe	Norman Clements & Norman Faulkner	1:56 0/0	$182,100
1981	Conquered	John Hayes, Jr.	John Hayes, Jr.	Beejay Stables, Charles Juravinski	1:58 1/5	$86,200
1980	Trenton Time	Billy Haughton	Billy Haughton	D. D. M. Stable	1:58 3/5	$52,000
1979	Composite	Ron Waples	Ron Waples	W.A.R. Stable	1:59 4/5	$52,000
1978	Abercrombie	Glen Garnsey	Glen Garnsey	L. Keith Bulen & Shirley A. Mitchell	1:56 4/5	$78,200
1977	Nat Lobell	John Kopas	Jack Kopas	Failsafe Stable	1:59 0/0	$31,900
1976	Windshield Wiper	Peter Haughton	Billy Haughton	Irving G. Liverman	2:00 0/0	$29,000
1975	Bret's Champ	Ben Steall	Billy Haughton	R. & E. W. Andrews, & C. & J. Caico	2:01 2/5	$25,250
1975	Albert's Star	Keith Waples	Keith Waples	Seiling Stables	1:59 4/5	$24,950
1974	Armbro Ontario	Joe O'Brien	Joe O'Brien	H. J. Carmichael & J. Elgin Armstrong	1:59 1/5	$25,150
1974	Mirror Image	Glen Garnsey	Glen Garnsey	Castleton Farm	2:00 1/5	$25,150
1973	Melvin's Woe	Joe O'Brien	Joe O'Brien	Thurman Downing	1:59 2/5	$25,600
1972	Lynden Bye Bye	Harold McKinley	Harold McKinley	Max J. Webster	1:59 2/5	$26,500
1971	Albatross	Stanley Dancer	Stanley Dancer	Albatross Stable	2:00 4/5	$24,800
1970	Columbia George	Roland Beaulieu	Roland Beaulieu	Mitzi Stable (Dr. George Smith )	1:57 4/5	$27,100
1969	Super Wave	Jack Kopas	Jack Kopas	Dr. George Boyce	2:02 1/5	$17,700
1968	Rum Customer	Alix Winger	Billy Haughton	Kennilworth Farms (Lloyd & Margaret Lloyds) & Louis & Connie Manucuso	2:01 0/0	$19,700
1967	Lynden Dodger	Robert Silliphant	Robert Silliphant	Max J. Webster	2:01 1/5	$13,225
1966	H A Meadowland	Ron Feagan	Ron Feagan	Ron & George Feagan	2:00 4/5	$8,950
1965	Jerry Hal	Wally McIllmurray	Wally McIllmurray	Mr. & Mrs. Jack Langford	2:29 0/0	$9,550
1964	Timely Knight	Roger White	Roger White	Allen Leblanc	2:16 1/5	$9,750
