= Ralph Hanover =

American Standardbred racehorse

- Sire: Meadow Skipper
- Grandsire: Dale Frost
- Dam: Ravina Hanover
- Damsire: Tar Heel
- Sex: Stallion
- Foaled: 1980
- Died: 2008
- Country: United States
- Color: Bay
- Breeder: Hanover Shoe Farms
- Owner: Waples Stable, Inc., Pointsetta Stables, Inc. (Stewart Firlotte), Grants Direct Stable (Richard Dinner & Norman Keyes)
- Trainer: Stewart "Stew" Firlotte
- Record: 40 starts, 27 wins
- Earnings: $1,815,395

Major wins
- Bluegrass Stakes (1982); Canadian Juvenile Circuit Stakes (1982); Geers Stakes (1983); Queen City Stakes (1983); Burlington Stakes (1983); Meadowlands Pace (1983); Adios Stakes (1983); Prix d'Été (1983); Simcoe Stakes (1983); Tattersalls Pace (1983)< U.S. Pacing Triple Crown wins: Messenger Stakes (1983); Cane Pace (1983); Little Brown Jug (1983)

Awards
- 1982 CTA 2YO C&G Pacer of the Year; 1983 CTA 3YO C&G Pacer of the Year; 1983 USA 3YO C&G Pacer of the Year

Honors
- Canadian Horse Racing Hall of Fame (1986)

Ralph Hanover (1980 – October 18, 2008) was a Standardbred colt who in 1983 became the seventh horse to capture the U.S. Pacing Triple Crown. Bred by Hanover Shoe Farms, as a yearling he was purchased for $58,000 by trainer Stewart Firlotte at the 1981 Standardbred Horse Sale Company's Harrisburg, Pennsylvania auction.

== Racing career ==
=== Two-year-old championship season ===
Ralph Hanover made his racing debut at age two on June 11, 1982. He would win seven of his fifteen starts that year including the Bluegrass Stakes in Lexington, Kentucky and two editions of the Canadian Juvenile Circuit Stakes at Greenwood Raceway in Toronto and at Blue Bonnets Raceway in Montreal. He was voted the 1982 Two-year-old Canadian Colt & Gelding Pacer of the Year.

=== Triple Crown and World records ===
At age three, Ralph Hanover won the 1983 Triple Crown for pacers by capturing the Messenger Stakes at Roosevelt Raceway on June 18, the Cane Pace at Yonkers Raceway on August 20, and the Little Brown Jug at the Delaware County, Ohio Fair Grounds on September 22. For trainer & co-owner Firlotte, Ralph Hanover was driven in all three races by co-owner and principal driver Ron Waples who would later be inducted into both the U.S. and Canadian Halls of Fame.

In addition to his 1983 Triple Crown wins, Ralph Hanover won seventeen additional pacing events including the very important Adios and Meadowlands Pace in the United States and the Prix d'Été in Canada at Blue Bonnets Raceway in which Ralph Hanover set a new world record for the fastest mile by a three-year-old on a five-eighths mile track with a time of 1:54 flat. He set a second world record time for three-year-old pacers on a half-mile track when he was clocked in 1:55 3/5. Ralph Hanover set yet another world record for earnings by a Standardbred horse in a single season with his 1983 earnings of $1,711,990. Ralph Hanover was again voted the Champion Canadian Colt & Gelding Pacer of the Year for his age group as well the 1983 Three-year-old United States Colt & Gelding Pacer of the Year Award. In 1986 he would be inducted into the Canadian Horse Racing Hall of Fame.

== At stud and retirement ==
Retired to stud after his three-year-old season having been syndicated for $7 million by P. J. "Jack" Baugh, owner of the historic Almahurst Farm near Nicholasville, Kentucky. Ralph Hanover was not as successful as a sire to the degree his investors had hoped. He was eventually sent to stand at Grand Royal Farms in Vienna, Ontario where he was pensioned before the 2001 breeding season at the age of 21. When Grand Royal Farms closed he was sent to Mac Lilley Farms in Dutton, Ontario where he remained until he had to be euthanized after old age brought on a debilitating illness.
