= 1988 Eagle Pro Box Lacrosse League playoffs =

1988 Eagle Pro Box Lacrosse League Playoffs
Tournament details
- Dates: N/A–March 20, 1988
- Teams: 4

Final positions
- Champions: Washington Wave
- Runner-up: New Jersey Saints
- Semifinalists: Philadelphia Wings

Awards
- MVP: Larry Quinn; Jeff Goldberg

The 1988 Eagle Pro Box Lacrosse League playoffs began in March 1988 with the championship on March 20, 1988.

3 teams made the playoffs, with the Defending Champions missing the playoffs, the New Jersey saints defeated the Philadelphia Wings, in the semi-finals. then the Washington wave defeated the New jersey saints for their first title, this is the 2nd title given out from the league.

== Playoffs ==
Semifinals			Championship
			2	New Jersey	17
3	Philadelphia	10	1	Washington	16
2	New Jersey	12

Playoff Game

Philadelphia Wings 10 @ New Jersey Saints 12

Championship

New Jersey Saints 17 @ Washington Wave 16

== See also ==
- 1988 in sports
