= Santanna Blue Chip =

Canadian Standardbred racehorse

Santanna Blue Chip (foaled 27 April 2005) is a champion Standardbred racehorse. He was sired by Art Major, out of Mmissus Hanover, a Matts Scooter mare. The colt was purchased at the Harrisburg Yearling Sales for $75,000. He is currently owned by Carl Jamieson, Jeffrey Gillis, George Arthur Stable, and 1140545 Ontario Ltd. Santanna Blue Chip earned a total of $1,622,636 while racing, including $931,223 as a juvenile.

The most notable of Santanna's achievements include wins of the 2007 Governor's Cup, and the 2007 Breeder's Crown.

After the conclusion of his racing career, Santanna Blue Chip turned to stallion duty in Canada, New Zealand and in the United States.

Date	Track	Race	Purse	Finish	Time	Last 1/4	Odds	Driver	Trainer
24 Nov 2007	Meadowlands	Breeders Crown	$650 000	1/NS	1:51.3	27.1	1.90	Jody Jamieson	Carl Jamieson
27 Oct 2007	Woodbine	D-Gov Cup F	$731 700	1/2Q	1:53.1	29.1	4.15	Jody Jamieson	Carl Jamieson
20 Oct 2007	Woodbine	D-Gov Cup E	$23 000	1/NK	1:51.4	27.0	3.35	Jody Jamieson	Carl Jamieson
15 Sep 2007	Mohawk	D-Nasagaweya	$145 300	3/6H	1:53.0	28.4	8.20	Jody Jamieson	Carl Jamieson
08 Sep 2007	Mohawk	D-Champlain	$115 884	2/3Q	1:51.3	26.0	8.75	Jody Jamieson	Carl Jamieson
01 Sep 2007	Mohawk	D-Metro F	$1 000 000	3/3	1:50.1	28.1	15.80	Jody Jamieson	Carl Jamieson
25 Aug 2007	Mohawk	D-Metro E	$40 000	2/1	1:52.3	28.2	10.10	Jody Jamieson	Carl Jamieson
06 Aug 2007	Mohawk	Dream Maker	$56 200	1/1Q	1:53.4	27.2	*0.35	Jody Jamieson	Carl Jamieson
23 Jul 2007	Mohawk	Dream Maker	$15 000	2/T	1:54.2	26.2	*0.50	Jody Jamieson	Carl Jamieson
08 Jul 2007	Flamboro Downs	Flmd Breeder	$50 955	2/1H	1:56.1	29.0	*0.20	Paul MacDonell	Carl Jamieson
29 Jun 2007	London	2Yr-C-Cond	$7 500	1/2	1:59.1	28.1	4.60	Jody Jamieson	Carl Jamieson
15 Jun 2007	Mohawk	2 YR-QUAL	$0	4/9	1:59.2	28.1	NB	Jody Jamieson	Carl Jamieson
