= Cam's Card Shark =

American Standardbred racehorse

- Breed: Standardbred
- Discipline: Harness racing
- Sire: Cam Fella
- Grandsire: Most Happy Fella
- Dam: Jefs Magic Trick
- Maternal grandsire: BGs Bunny
- Sex: Stallion
- Foaled: 1991
- Country: United States
- Breeder: Jef's Standbardbred Country Club
- Trainer: Bill Robinson

Record
- 32:20–5–5

Earnings
- $2,498,204

Major wins
- Meadowlands Pace (1994); Messenger Stakes (1994); North America Cup (1994); James Dancer Memorial (1994); William Miller Memorial (1994); Adios Pace (1994); Art Rooney Pace (1994)

Awards
- USA 3-Year Old Colt Pacer of the Year & American Harness Horse of the Year (1994)

Cam's Card Shark (1991-2020) is an American champion standardbred horse. His sire (father) was Cam Fella, who earned more than $2 million during his racing career, and his dam (mother) was Jef's Magic Trick, who only earned $28,340 during her career. He was named the 1994 American Horse of the Year by the United States Trotting Association and held the then-record of most money earned by a Standardbred horse in a single year. During his two years of competition until his retirement in 1994, Cam's Card Shark had 20 wins, earning more than $2.4 million.

== Racing career ==
As a 2-Year Old in 1993 Cam's Card Shark won the Lou Babic Memorial and five of his fourteen starts.

In 1994 Cam's Card Shark won 15 of 18 starts. He won the Meadowlands Pace in 1:50 and also secured wins in the North America Cup, Berry's Creek, Messenger Stakes, New Jersey Classic, the Adios Pace, James B. Dancer Memorial, Art Rooney Pace and the Miller Memorial.

The Messenger was the first leg of the Triple Crown in 1994 and Cam's Card Shark won in a stakes record 1:51. He then won the Meadowlands Pace in 1:50. In the Adios Pace he won by 3 1/4 lengths running his last half mile in 54 1/5 seconds. Before the elimination to the Little Brown Jug Cam's Card Shark was scratched for lameness and never raced again.

He had become the leading single-season money-winner of all time, earning $2,264,714 from 18 starts in 1994 with 15 wins. He was the fourth pacer in the history of harness racing to earn more than $2 million in one season. Cam's Card Shark was voted Harness Horse of the Year for 1994.

== Retirement ==
Cam's Card Shark was elected to the Hall of Fame. At the time of his election he had sired the winners of $68 million including five $2m winners. His progeny include Holborn Hanover who has the fastest race mile in history, three Little Brown Jug winners including Bettor's Delight and other renown horses including Royalflush Hanover, Four Starzzz Shark, Million Dollar Cam and Shark Gesture. His son Bettor's Delight has extended the sire line that began through Meadow Skipper and his son Most Happy Fella.

In April 2012, Cam's Card Shark had to get scrotal hernia surgery, and part of his testicle and his small intestine had to be removed. Cam's Card Shark died in July 2020.

== Pedigree ==
Pedigree of Cam's Card Shark
Sire Cam Fella	Most Happy Fella	Meadow Skipper	Dale Frost
Sire Cam Fella	Most Happy Fella	Meadow Skipper	Countless Vivian
Sire Cam Fella	Most Happy Fella	Laughing Girl	Good Time
Sire Cam Fella	Most Happy Fella	Laughing Girl	Maxine's Dream
Sire Cam Fella	Nan Cam	Bret Hanover	Adios
Sire Cam Fella	Nan Cam	Bret Hanover	Brenna Hanover
Sire Cam Fella	Nan Cam	Nan Frost	Dale Frost
Sire Cam Fella	Nan Cam	Nan Frost	Mynah Hanover
Dam Jef's Magic Trick	B.G's Bunny	Albatross	Meadow Skipper
Dam Jef's Magic Trick	B.G's Bunny	Albatross	Voodoo Hanover
Dam Jef's Magic Trick	B.G's Bunny	Brets Romance	Bret Hanover
Dam Jef's Magic Trick	B.G's Bunny	Brets Romance	Knight's Embassy
Dam Jef's Magic Trick	Meadow Trick	Overtrick	Solicitor
Dam Jef's Magic Trick	Meadow Trick	Overtrick	Overbid
Dam Jef's Magic Trick	Meadow Trick	Meadow Maine	Direct Rhythm
Dam Jef's Magic Trick	Meadow Trick	Meadow Maine	Medios
