= JK She'salady =

Standardbred racehorse

- Breed: Standardbred
- Sire: Art Major
- Grandsire: Artsplace
- Dam: Presidential Lady
- Damsire: Presidential Ball
- Sex: Mare
- Foaled: 2012
- Owner: 3 Brothers Stable (Ronnie, Steven, & Alan Katz)
- Trainer: Nancy Johansson
- Earnings: $972,730

Major wins
- She's A Great Lady Stakes (2014); Three Diamonds Stakes (2014) Breeders Crown wins: Breeders Crown 2YO Filly Pace (2014)

Honors
- American Harness Horse of the Year (2014); Canadian Harness Horse of the Year (2014)

JK She'salady is a Standardbred pacing mare foaled in 2012 by Art Major and out of Presidential Lady. During her career she recorded 13 wins in 16 starts, capping it off with the prestigious Breeders Crown 2YO Filly Pace. Her lifetime earnings were $972,730. JK She'salady was harness racing's Horse of the Year in Canada and the United States for 2014.

On September 24, her trainer Nancy Johansson announced that she had been retired due to a bacterial lung infection. JK Shesalady will become a broodmare.
