= North America Cup =

- Class: Grade I
- Location: Woodbine Mohawk Park; Campbellville, Ontario, Canada
- Inaugurated: 1984 (42 years ago)
- Race type: Standardbred (Pace)
- Website: woodbine.com/mohawk/

Race information
- Distance: 1 mile
- Surface: Dirt
- Track: Left-handed
- Qualification: 3-year-olds
- Purse: $1,000,000 (2025)

The North America Cup is a Grade I annual harness racing event for 3-year-old standardbred pacing horses which is held at Woodbine Mohawk Park in Campbellville, Ontario, Canada. The race replaced the Queen City Pace run from 1964 to 1983. From 1984 to 1993, the North America Cup was held at Greenwood Raceway and from 1994 to 2006, the North America Cup was held at Woodbine Entertainment Group's other harness racing venue, Woodbine Racetrack. It is the co-richest harness race in North America at $1,000,000. The race was named a Grade I when graded stakes classifications were introduced to harness racing in 2025.

== Records ==
Most wins by a driver

- 6 – John Campbell (1991, 1994, 1995, 1996, 1997, 1999)

Most wins by a trainer

- 3 – William G. Robinson (1993, 1994, 2002)

Stakes record

- 1:47 1/5 – Louprint (2025)

== North America Cup winners ==
Year	Winner	Driver	Trainer	Owner	Time	Purse
2026	Odds On Mr Mamba	James MacDonald	Melanie Wrenn	Odds On Racing	1:48 1/5	$1,000,000
2025	Louprint	Ronnie Wrenn Jr.	Ron Burke	Burke Racing Stable, Weaver Bruscemi, Phil Collura, Larry Karr	1:47 1/5	$1,000,000
2024	Nijinsky	Louis-Philippe Roy	Anthony Beaton	West Wins Stable, John Fielding, Mark Dumain	1:48 1/5	$1,000,000
2023	It's My Show	Scott Zeron	Linda Toscano	Richard Young, Joanne Young	1:47 4/5	$1,000,000
2022	Pebble Beach	Todd McCarthy	Noel Daley	Patricia Stable, Joe Sbrocco, Country Club Acres Inc., Laexpressfoderadeovolente	1:50 0/0	$1,000,000
2021	Desperate Man	Trevor Henry	Kathy Cecchin	Kathy Cecchin, John Cecchin, Nicole Davies, and Arthur Davies	1:49 3/5	$1,000,000
2020	Tall Dark Stranger	Yannick Gingras	Nancy Takter	Crawford Farms Racing, Marvin Katz, Caviart Farms, and Howard Taylor	1:48 2/5	$1,000,000
2019	Captain Crunch	Scott Zeron	Nancy Takter	3 Brothers Stable, Christina Takter, Rojan Stables, and Caviart Farms	1:47 2/5	$1,000,000
2018	Lather Up	Montrell Teague	Clyde Francis	Gary and Barbara Iles	1:48 1/5	$1,000,000
2017	Fear the Dragon	David Miller	Brian Brown	Emerald Highlands Farm	1:48 4/5	$1,000,000
2016	Betting Line	David Miller	Casie Coleman	Casie Coleman, Ross Warriner, Steve & Christine Calhoun, Mac Nichol	1:47 4/5	$1,000,000
2015	Wakizashi Hanover	Tim Tetrick	Joann Looney-King	Tri County Stable	1:48 0/0	$1,000,000
2014	JK Endofanera	Brian Sears	Ron Burke	3 Brothers Stables	1:48 4/5	$1,000,000
2013	Captaintreacherous	Tim Tetrick	Tony Alagna	M. Bell, Brittany Farms, M. Katz, J. Sbrocco, Riverview Farm, M. Parisi	1:48 3/5	$1,000,000
2012	Thinking Out Loud	Randy Waples	Robert McIntosh	Robert McIntosh Stables Inc., C S X Stables, Al McIntosh Holdings Inc.	1:47 4/5	$1,500,000
2011	Up The Credit	Jody Jamieson	Carl Jamieson	Carl Jamieson, Thomas Kyron, Brian Paquet, Joanne Morrison	1:49 3/5	$1,500,000
2010	Sportswriter	Mark J. MacDonald	Casie Coleman	Steve Calhoun	1:48 3/5	$1,500,000
2009	Well Said	Ronald Pierce	Steve Elliott	Jeffrey S. Snyder, Lothlorien Equestrian	1:48 1/5	$1,500,000
2008	Somebeachsomewhere	Paul MacDonell	Brent MacGrath	Brent McGrath, Schooner Stables	1:49 0/0	$1,500,000
2007	Tell All	Jody Jamieson	Blair Burgess	MY Desire Stable	1:50 3/5	$1,500,000
2006	Total Truth	Ronald Pierce	Brenda Teague	Only Money Inc., Teague Inc.,	1:49 1/5	$1,500,000
2005	Rocknroll Hanover	Brian Sears	Brett Pelling	Jeffrey S. Snyder, Lothlorien Equestrian	1:49 4/5	$1,542,500
2004	Mantacular	Catello Manzi	Larry Rathbone	M And L of Delaware Inc.	1:51 2/5	$1,629,500
2003	Yankee Cruiser	Dean Magee	Tim Pinske	Brian Pinskie Stable Inc, Nick Barbieri, Pinskie Stables	1:49 3/5	$1,542,500
2002	Red River Hanover	Luc Ouellette	William Robinson	Jeffrey S. Snyder, Lothorien Farms	1:48 4/5	$1,500,000
2001	Bettor's Delight	Michel Lachance	Scott McEneny	John B. Grant	1:50 0/0	$1,148,500
2000	Gallo Blue Chip	Daniel Dubé	Mark Ford	Martin Scharf	1:50 1/5	$1,000,000
1999	The Panderosa	John Campbell	Brett Pelling	Peter Pan Stables Inc. (Robert Glazer)	1:49 4/5	$1,000,000
1998	Straight Path	Michel Lachance	Shawn Robinson	Anthony Delmonte & Antoinette Liberto	1:51 2/5	$1,000,000
1997	Gothic Dream	John Campbell	Jack Darling	Jack Darling Stables, Dan Smith	1:50 4/5	$1,000,000
1996	Arizona Jack	John Campbell	Gary Machiz	Leon & Gary Machiz, Barry Rubenstein Farms	1:55 1/5	$1,000,000
1995	David's Pass	John Campbell	Brett Pelling	RJS Stable	1:52 1/5	$1,000,000
1994	Cam's Card Shark	John Campbell	William Robinson	Jeffrey S. Snyder	1:51 4/5	$1,000,000
1993	Presidential Ball	Ron Waples	William Robinson	Antonio Chiaravalle	1:51 0/0	$1,000,000
1992	Safely Kept	Michel Lachance	Joe Holloway	Robert Suslow	1:53 1/5	$1,000,000
1991	Precious Bunny	John Campbell	William Robinson	R. Peter Heffering	1:53 0/0	$1,000,000
1990	Apaches Fame	William "Bud" Fritz	William "Bud" Fritz	Dovers Venture II	1:53 4/5	$1,000,000
1989	Goalie Jeff	Steve Condren	Thomas Artandi	Centre Ice Stable	1:53 2/5	$1,000,000
1988	Runnymede Lobell	Yves Filion	Yves Filion	Bayama Farms & Normand Mondoux	1:54 4/5	$1,000,000
1987	Jate Lobell	Mark O'Mara	Mark O'Mara	Joe McCluskey & Kentuckiana Farms	1:52 3/5	$1,000,000
1986	Quite A Sensation	Trevor Ritchie	R. Claire Porter	R. Claire Porter	1:54 3/5	$488,000
1985	Staff Director	Dave Wall	Dave Wall	Galleon & Green-White-Red Stable	1:55 2/5	$387,500
1984	Legal Notice	Dr. John Hayes	Dr. John Hayes	J. Hayes Stable, Quarter Century Club, J. Burns	1:55 3/5	$357,900

== See also ==
- North American Cup
