= Cane Pace =

- Class: Triple Crown
- Location: Meadowlands Racing & Entertainment; East Rutherford, New Jersey (since 2015)
- Inaugurated: 1955 (71 years ago)
- Race type: Standardbred
- Website: www.hambletonian.com/upcomingstakes/canepace

Race information
- Distance: 1 mile (8.0 furlongs)
- Surface: Dirt
- Track: Left-handed
- Qualification: 3-year-olds
- Purse: $315,750 (2023)

The Cane Pace is a harness horse race for standardbred pacers contested annually since 1955. The race was first run as the William H. Cane Futurity in 1955 at Yonkers Raceway in New York. In 1956 the race joined with the Little Brown Jug and the Messenger Stakes to become the first leg in the Triple Crown of Harness Racing for Pacers.

The Cane Pace of 2004 resulted in the only dead heat in the race's history and one where the two horses had the same trainer and owner.

As of 2023, the Cane Pace is held at the Meadowlands Racetrack in New Jersey as part of the undercard for the Hambletonian Stakes, the first leg of the Triple Crown of Harness Racing for Trotters.

== Distances ==
- 2016–present: 1 1/8 miles (1810.5 metres, 9.5 furlongs) (If 12 horses start)
- 1963–present : 1 mile (1609.3 metres, 8 furlongs) (If no more than 11 horses start)
- 1955–1962 : 1 1/16 miles (1709.9 metres, 8.5 furlongs)

== Locations ==
- 1955–1997 - Yonkers Raceway
- 1998–2010 - Freehold Raceway
- 2011 - Pocono Downs (Originally scheduled for Tioga Downs but had to be moved due to flooding)
- 2012–2014 - Tioga Downs
- 2015–present - Meadowlands Racetrack

== Records ==
Most wins by a driver

- 5 – John Campbell (1985, 1989, 1990, 2002, 2004)

Most wins by a trainer

- 4 – Stanley Dancer (1970, 1971, 1973, 1976)

Stakes record

- 1:46 2/5. Legendary Hanover (2024)

== Cane Pace winners ==
Year	Winner	Driver	Trainer	Owner	Dist.	Time	Purse
2026	Sweet Lovin Lou	Tim Tetrick	Daniel Lagace	Lagace Stables, Edwin Buhler, Big Als Stables & Brittany Farms	1 m	1:47 3/5	$310,750
2025	Captain Optimistic	Dexter Dunn	Nancy Takter	3 Brothers Stables, Marvin Katz and Caviart Farms	1 m	1:48 1/5	$315,764
2024	Legendary Hanover	James MacDonald	Anthony Beaton	Eric Good, West Wins Stable and Mark Dumain	1 m	1:46 1/5	$248,000
2023	Confederate	Tim Tetrick	Brett Pelling	Diamond Creek Racing LLC	1 m	1:47 3/5	$315,750
2022	Beach Glass	Yannick Gingras	Brent MacGrath	Schooner II Stable	1 m	1:49 0/0	$258,300
2021	Rockyroad Hanover	Dexter Dunn	Tony Alagna	Riverview Racing LLC, B Grant, K Jacobs, and VJ Stable	1 m	1:48 1/5	$276,150
2020	Tall Dark Stranger	Yannick Gingras	Nancy Takter	Crawford Farms Racing, Marvin Katz, Caviart Farms & Howard Taylor	1 m	1:47 1/5	$273,125
2019	Captain Crunch	Scott Zeron	Nancy Johansson	3 Brothers Stables, C. Takter, Rojan Stables & Caviart Farms	1 m	1:48 0/5	$285,362
2018	Stay Hungry	Doug McNair	Tony Alagna	Bradley Grant & Irwin Samelman	1 m	1:47 3/5	$281,000
2017	Huntsville	Tim Tetrick	Ray Schnittker	Schnittker, Gewertz, Arnold & Crawford Farms	1 1/8 m	2:03 0/0	$334,325
2016	Control The Moment	Brian Sears	Brad Maxwell	Control The Moment Stable	1 1/8 m	2:02 4/5	$320,000
2015	Dealt A Winner	David Miller	Mark Silva	Jeffrey S. Snyder	1 m	1:47 3/5	$319,400
2014	Lyonssomewhere	Yannick Gingras	Jimmy Takter	Geoffrey Lyons Mound	1 m	1:49 4/5	$437,325
2013	Captaintreacherous	Tim Tetrick	Tony Alagna	Captaintreacherous Racing Stable	1 m	1:49 2/5	$360,211
2012	Dynamic Youth	George Brennan	Aaron Lambert	J and T Silva Stables	1 m	1:48 4/5	$322 716
2011	Betterthancheddar	Yannick Gingras	Casie Coleman	Steve Calhoun & West Wins Stable	1 m	1:49 2/5	$342,875
2010	One More Laugh	Tim Tetrick	Ray Schnittker	Mathias Meinzinger, Jerry Silva, R. Schnittker	1 m	1:50 3/5	$300,000
2009	Vintage Master	Daniel Dubé	Jimmy Takter	Brittany Farms & Estate of Brian Monieson	1 m	1:50 4/5	$325,000
2008	Art Official	Ronald Pierce	Joe Seekman	Sawgrass Farms	1 m	1:51 1/5	$392,850
2007	Always A Virgin	Brian Sears	Joe Holloway	Bluestone Farms, et al.	1 m	1:51 1/5	$297,500
2006	Total Truth	Ronald Pierce	George Teague, Jr.	Only Money Inc., Teague Inc.	1 m	1:51 3/5	$301,587
2005	Royal Flush Shark	Eric Ledford	Seldon Ledford	D'Elegance Stable, Royal Flush Stable, C. Iannacone, G. Giamarino	1 m	1:52 4/5	$346,000
2004 (DH)	Timesareachanging	Ronald Pierce	Brett Pelling	Perfect World Enterprises	1 m	1:52 3/5	$334,975
2004 (DH)	Western Terror	John Campbell	Brett Pelling	Perfect World Enterprises	1 m	1:52 3/5	$334,975
2003	No Pan Intended	David Miller	Ivan Sugg	Peter Pan Stables Inc. (Robert Glazer)	1 m	1:53 3/5	$331,000
2002	Art Major	John Campbell	Monte Gelrod	Deena Frost, Thomas & Louis Pontone, Lou & Debora Domiano	1 m	1:53 1/5	$369,188
2001	Four Starzzz Shark	David Miller	Edward Hart	Four Starzzz Shark Stable (Jeff Cohen & Mike Sudaley)	1 m	1:53 3/5	$345,694
2000	Powerful Toy	Luc Ouellette	Monte Gelrod	Newman Racing, Dodge A Bullet Sable, Sampson Street Stable	1 m	1:51 4/5	$331,350
1999	Blissfull Hall	Ronald Pierce	Benjamin Wallace	Daniel Plouffe	1 m	1:51 4/5	$377,934
1998	Shady Character	Michel Lachance	Brett Pelling	Sanford & Corinne Goldfarb	1 m	1:53 2/5	$379,941
1997	Western Dreamer	Michel Lachance	William Robinson	Matthew J., Patrick J. Jr. & Daniel J. Daly	1 m	1:53 2/5	$318,141
1996	Scoot To Power	Catello Manzi	Jonas Stutzman	Jim R. Miller, et al.	1 m	1:55 1/5	$326,429
1995	Mattgilla Gorilla	David Ingraham	William Andrews	Edmund & David Smith, Alan Foster	1 m	1:54 2/5	$384,375
1994	Falcons Future	Ken Holliday	Lonnie McIntosh	Elden & Mary Ann Combs	1 m	1:53 2/5	$391,780
1993	Riyadh	Jim Morrill, Jr.	William Robinson	R. Peter Heffering	1 m	1:51 2/5	$432,800
1992	Western Hanover	Bill Fahy	Gene Riegle	George Segal	1 m	1:53 3/5	$364,350
1991	Silky Stallone	Jack Moiseyev	Brett Pelling	Louis P. Guida	1 m	1:53 3/5	$523,190
1990	Jake And Elwood	John Campbell	Ken Seeber	Louis P. Guida	1 m	1:55 1/5	$486,550
1989	Dancing Master	John Campbell	Ken Seeber	Louis P. Guida	1 m	1:56 2/5	$621,210
1988	Runnymede Lobell	Yves Filion	Yves Filion	Yves Filion & Normand Mondoux	1 m	1:55 2/5	$583,790
1987	Righteous Bucks	Michel Lachance	Richard Marine	Fred Borman, et al.	1 m	1:56 0/0	$581,540
1986	Barberry Spur	Bill O'Donnell	Richard Stillings	Roy D. Davis & Barberry Farms	1 m	1:55 1/5	$542,764
1985	Chairmanoftheboard	John Campbell	Samuel "Skip" Lewis	New Concept Stable (Louis P. Guida, et al.)	1 m	1:55 1/5	$600,000
1984	On The Road Again	William "Buddy" Gilmour	Harry J. Poulton	Gordon & Illa Rumpel	1 m	1:56 4/5	$600,000
1983	Ralph Hanover	Ron Waples	Stewart Firlotte	Ron Waples, Pointsetta Stables, Grants Direct Stables	1 m	1:57 0/0	$559,230
1982	Cam Fella	Pat Crowe	Pat Crowe	Norman Clements & Norman Faulkner	1 m	1:57 3/5	$513,300
1981	Wildwood Jeb	Jimmy Marohn	Larry Rolla	Joel Weinberg	1 m	1:58 1/5	$373,850
1980	Niatross	Clint Galbraith	Clint Galbraith	Niatross Syndicate	1 m	1:57 3/5	$321,365
1979	Happy Motoring	Bill Popfinger	Bill Popfinger	Steve Ransom, et al.	1 m	1:57 3/5	$336,420
1978	Armbro Tiger	Hervé Filion	Louis Meittinis	Louis Meittinis & Julius Weiss	1 m	1:58 1/5	$307,594
1977	Jate Prince	Jack Kopas	Jack Kopas	C. Edwin Armstrong	1 m	1:58 2/5	$286,500
1976	Keystone Ore	Stanley Dancer	Stanley Dancer	Perry, Jones, Dancer, Dancer & Hild	1 m	1:57 1/5	$200,000
1975	Nero	Joe O'Brien	James Crane	Standardbred breeding	1 m	1:58 4/5	$200,000
1974	Boyden Hanover	William Herman	Sandy Levy	George Sholty, Mr. & Mrs. Frank Allecia, Mr. & Mrs. James Picciano	1 m	1:59 4/5	$121,822
1973	Smog	Vernon Dancer	Stanley Dancer	Alfred M. Cuddy	1 m	1:58 4/5	$100,000
1972	Hilarious Way	John F. Simpson, Jr.	John F. Simpson, Sr.	Gainesway Farm	1 m	2:02 2/5	$107,097
1971	Albatross	Stanley Dancer	Stanley Dancer	Amicable Stable	1 m	2:00 0/0	$106,795
1970	Most Happy Fella	Stanley Dancer	Stanley Dancer	Egyptian Acres Stable	1 m	1:58 3/5	$102,770
1969	Kat Byrd	Eldon G. Harner	Levi B. Harner	Ted J. Zornow	1 m	2:02 2/5	$100,000
1968	Rum Customer	Billy Haughton	Billy Haughton	Louis & Connie Manucuso & Kennilworth Farm	1 m	1:59 4/5	$150,000
1967	Meadow Paige	Billy Haughton	Billy Haughton	Jack Stahl	1 m	2:03 0/0	$150,000
1966	Romeo Hanover	William Myer	Jerry Silverman	Lucky Star Stables & Morton Finder	1 m	1:59 4/5	$126,915
1965	Bret Hanover	Frank Ervin	Frank Ervin	Richard Downing	1 m	2:01 0/0	$125,236
1964	Race Time	Ralph N. Baldwin	Ralph Baldwin	Castleton Farm	1 m	2:01 4/5	$123,191
1963	Meadow Skipper	Earle Avery	Earle Avery	Norman S. Woolworth	1 m	1:58 4/5	$163,187
1962	Ranger Knight	Clint Hodgins	Eugene Minniear	Eugene Minniear & Dr. V. T. Scroggin	1 1/16 m	2:13 1/5	$117,542
1961	Cold Front	Clint Hodgins	Clint Hodgins	Stoneybrook Stable	1 1/16 m	2:08 3/5	$110,950
1960	Countess Adios	Delvin Miller	Delvin Miller	J. Elgin & Ted Armstrong & Hugh A. Grant, Sr.	1 1/16 m	2:08 0/0	$65,245
1959	Adios Butler	Clint Hodgins	Clint Hodgins	Paige West & Angelo Pellillo	1 1/16 m	2:09 0/0	$64,457
1958	Raider Frost	Hugh Bell	Joe O'Brien	S. A. Camp Farms	1 1/16 m	2:08 1/5	$60,457
1957	Torpid	John F. Simpson, Sr.	John F. Simpson, Sr.	John F. Simpson, Sr.	1 1/16 m	2:09 1/5	$66,952
1956	Noble Adios	John F. Simpson Sr.	John F. Simpson, Sr.	John F. Simpson, Sr.	1 1/16 m	2:09 2/5	$71,570
1955	Quick Chief	Billy Haughton	Billy Haughton	Farmsted Acres & John Froelich	1 1/16 m	2:11 1/5	$71,040
