= Georgia Pacific (horse) =

Standardbred racehorse

Georgia Pacific (foaled April 13, 2001) is a dark bay Standardbred race horse sired by Western Hanover and out of Armbro Savannah. He is trained by Randy Bendis and driven by Tony Hall. He races at The Meadows Racetrack and Casino in Meadow Lands, Pennsylvania.

== Life before racing ==
Georgia Pacific was purchased by Randy Bendis for $32,000 at the Tattersalls sale. Bendis couldn’t be at the sale himself to see the colt, so he sent Doug Snyder to look at the horse. Snyder said that he was one of the Westerns that needed to become a gelding.

== Racing career ==
=== Age 2 ===
In his early 2-year-old races, Georgia Pacific finished second in his first Meadows baby race on June 5, 2003, he then reeled off three straight wins, capped off by a victory in a $20,474 Sire Stakes event on July 5, 2003. Georgia Pacific was scratched sick from his next start, but came back on August 9, 2003, for the $19,296 Arden Downs. He was roughed up from post 9 and finished 5th. Two weeks later, he won a Sires Stakes event at Pocono Downs in 1:54:3 and was second in his next PA stake at The Meadows after cutting the mile on September 5, 2003. On September 15, 2003, he won the PA All Stars at Pocono Downs in his freshman record at 1:53.

With a break in state-bred action, Bendis sent his charge to The Red Mile for a pair of late-closers during Grand Circuit week. Georgia Pacific ended his freshman season finishing second in both the October 11, 2003, Keystone Classic and the October 18, 2003, PA Sires Stake final.

=== Age 3 ===
Bendis began 2004 early with a pair of March qualifiers for Georgia Pacific at The Meadows. While Bendis handled training duties at home, second trainer Dave Teed took charge of the horse.

Georgia Pacific’s first test came in the Robert Suslow Memorial series where, paired with Dave Miller, the pacer was second in the first leg. He and Ron Pierce managed second as well in the second leg. For the final, however, the gelding was matched with a familiar driver, long-time Meadows reinsman Brian Sears. After finishing third in the Suslow final, Sears steered Georgia Pacific to a second-place finish from post 8 in the elimination for the Berry’s Creek, before a tough overland journey from post 9 in the final netted them a fourth-place finish. Georgia Pacific headed next for Windsor Raceway, where he drew post 2 in the eliminations for the Provincial Cup and won going away in 1:52:1. A week later, from post 5, he finished fourth behind Quick Pulse Mindale in the final.

A year to the day after making his first lifetime start, Georgia Pacific was at Mohawk Racetrack for the $74,000 Burlington, where he again drew the outside with post 8. Sears steered the horse to beat Mantacular to the wire in a lifetime best 1:49:4. A week later, from post 8 at Woodbine, Georgia Pacific won his North America Cup elimination in 1:49:4. Since Woodbine began last season allowing elimination winners to pick their post position for the final, Bendis was, for the first time, assured his pacer would have a good gate spot for the final.

Going into the $1,189,535 North America Cup final on June 19, 2004, Georgia Pacific had the post he wanted and his regular driver, and he was made the betting favorite. Unexpectedly, Ritchie Silverman, with a 55-1 shot Village Hero N, shot for the lead from post 5, parking Metropolitan in second, Rogue Hall in 3rd, and Georgia Pacific in sixth. Rogue Hall had the lead past the half, with Georgia Pacific parked without cover and Mantacular sitting on his back second-over. At the three-quarters, Georgia Pacific was still on the outside, and though he reached third in the stretch, Mantacular swung off his back and won by a head in 1:51:2. Georgia Pacific ended up fifth, a length back.

He next headed west to Balmoral Park, where he was matched with new driver Andy Ray Miller. The gelding won his elimination for the American-National in 1:49:4 and was sent to the final as the favorite over hometown hero Quick Pulse Mindale. However, it began to rain, and Georgia Pacific went postward on a sloppy track. He was again parked the whole mile and ended up fifth in Quick Pulse Mindale’s 1:51:4 effort. Thereafter, the pacer headed east again, this time for the Meadowlands Pace, where he was third in his elimination behind Circle L Kid and drew post 3 for the July 17, 2004, final. He finished third again.

Georgia Pacific spent the rest of July vacationing at home in Pennsylvania. After a qualifier on July 30, 2004, at The Meadows, Bendis sent him back to The Meadowlands for the last stakes race of the meet, the Oliver Wendell Holmes on closing day. Leaving from post 6, Sears sent the pacer for the lead. Georgia Pacific was nearly two lengths in front of Driven to Win when he hit the wire in 1:49:1. Next up was the Adios at The Meadows, which Bendis described as “the biggest race right in our own backyard.” Georgia Pacific went straight for the lead from post 7 and won the first heat over Driven to Win and Western Terror in 1:50. Though Timesareachanging was two lengths better at the wire the final, with Georgia Pacific second, Bendis considered the first-heat win the “biggest thrill” of his racing career.

After a week break, Georgia Pacific used a Meadows preferred event as a sharpener, winning in 1:49:4, a track record.
