= Overtrick =

American Standardbred racehorse

- Breed: Standardbred
- Sire: Solicitor (USA)
- Grandsire: Kings Counsel (USA)
- Dam: Overbid (USA)
- Maternal grandsire: Hal Dale (USA)
- Sex: Stallion
- Foaled: 1960
- Country: United States
- Colour: Bay

Earnings
- $407,483

Honours
- Best mile rate, 1:57.1
- Last updated on: 2009-04-17.

Overtrick (foaled 1960) was a champion U.S. standardbred racehorse who was memorable for his breaking of many existing world records and his classic duels with champion pacer Meadow Skipper.

Overtrick raced against crack pacers Meadow Skipper and Country Don in all three legs of the 1963 harness racing Triple Crown. In the first leg, Meadow Skipper thumped Overtrick in a track record time. In the second race of the series, the Little Brown Jug, Overtrick turned the tables on Meadow Skipper beating him in second with Country Don third, and at the same time breaking the world record. Overtrick repeated the performance in the Messenger Stakes with Country Don second and Meadow Skipper third.

== See also ==
- Harness racing in America
- Cardigan Bay
