= Bettor's Delight =

American Standardbred racehorse and international shuttle stallion

- Breed: Standardbred
- Sire: Cam's Card Shark (US)
- Dam: Classic Wish
- Maternal grandsire: Ambro Emerson
- Sex: Stallion
- Foaled: 1998-05-04
- Country: United States of America
- Breeder: Winbak Farm

Record
- 26 starts-15 wins-6 seconds-1 third.
- Last updated on: 2022-02-13.

Bettor's Delight is a former champion American Standardbred race-horse and one of the World's greatest stud stallions.

Bettor's Delight was foaled on 4 May 1998 and bred by Winbak Farm of Chesapeake City, Maryland. He was purchased for $65,000 at the 1999 Harrisburg yearling sale by John B. Grant of Milton, Ontario.

In 2007 he was inducted into the Canadian Horse Racing Hall of Fame and in 2013 into the Harness Racing Museum & Hall of Fame.

It is believed that Bettors Delight is the highest ever income-earning pacing or harness racing stallion.

== Race record ==
Bettor's Delight was trained by Scott McEneny and usually driven by Michel Lachance.

As a 2-year old in 2000 he won the Nassagaweya Stake, Breeders Crown 2YO Colt & Gelding Pace and Governors Cup. He also won the Dan Patch Award (U.S.) Two-Year-Old Pacing Colt of the Year category and O'Brien (Canada) Two-Year-Old Colt Pacer of the Year awards.

As a 3-year old in 2001 Better's Delight won:

- New Jersey Classic Pace. His sire Cam's Card Shark won this same race in 1994.
- North America Cup. Cam's Card Shark also won this race in 1994.
- Simcoe Stakes.
- Little Brown Jug and
- Tattersalls Pace.

He won the O'Brien Awards for Three-Year-Old Colt Pacer of the Year and Horse of the Year, along with the Dan Patch Award for Three-Year-Old Pacing Colt of the Year.

== Stud record ==
Bettor’s Delight commenced standing as a stud stallion at Blue Chip Farms in New York in 2002 before moving to Winbak Farm, Ontario in 2012. For 2013 and 2014 he stood in Pennsylvania, before returning to Ontario for the following year. From 2007 he was also a shuttle sire at Woodlands Stud, Auckland, New Zealand.

Bettor's Delight was named sire of the decades for 2000–2019 in America and has been the leading sire in both New Zealand and Australia on multiple occasions. His service fee in New Zealand was raised to $25,000 to reduce demand.

His progeny includes:

Name	Dam	Dam sire	Major wins/achievements
Adore Me	Scuse Me	BG's Bunny (USA)	2014 New Zealand Trotting Cup.
All Bets Off	Armbro Penelope	Dexter Nukes	Winner of the 2104 Messenger Stakes. Won stakes of $3,186,658. Standing at Stud in Ohio
Beautide	Gorse Bush	Ticket To Heaven	winner of the 2013 Miracle Mile Pace, 2014 Len Smith Mile, 2014 and 2015 Inter Dominion Pacing Championship
Betting Line	Heathers Western	Western Hanover	Winner of the 2016 Little Brown Jug and the 2016 O’Brien Award for Horse of the Year
Bettor Sweet	Soky's Sweetheart	Sokys Atom (USA)	2011 and 2012 Breeders Crown Open Pace.
Bettor's Edge	Spring Wind	Life Sign	winner of the 2015 TVG Pacing Championship
Bettor's Wish	Lifetime Star	Western Ideal	2020 McKee Memorial, Dayton Pacing Derby, TVG Final and the 2020 Dan Patch Award for Older Pacer of the Year.
Bit Of A Legend	Soky's Legend	Soky's Atom (USA)	2012 NZ Yearling Sales 2YO final (listed, NZ), Australian Breeders Crown x2, George Morton Levy Memorial Pacing Series, Battle of Lake Erie. $2,569,621 in career earnings when retiring 2019. Standing as a sire at Bloomingburh, Ohio
Caviart Ally	Allamerican Cool	No Nukes	Winner of the 2019 Breeders Crown and O’Brien Award for older Pacing Mare of the Year
Chicago Bull	Chicago Blues	Christian Cullen	2016 West Australian Derby, 2017 West Australian Cup and the 2017 & 2020 Fremantle Cups.
Darlin's Delight	Town Pro	Big Towner	2006 Dan Patch Award winner for best three-year-old filly pacer and winner of the Three Diamonds, Fan Hanover, Milton, Lady Liberty, and Golden Girls.
Gold Ace	Hill Of Gold	In The Pocket	2010 Sire Stakes Final, 2011 New Zealand Derby, 2011 Golden Nugget (Perth) and 2012 New Zealand Free For All.
Have Faith in Me	Scuse Me	BG's Bunny (USA)	2015 New Zealand Derby.
Lazarus	Bethany	Christian Cullen	Two-times New Zealand Horse of the Year, winner of the 2016 and 2017 New Zealand Trotting Cup and 2017 Inter Dominion Pacing Championship.
Leap To Fame	Lettucereason	Art Major (USA)	2023 Inter Dominion Pacing Championship, the 2024 A G Hunter Cup & Miracle Mile Pace and 2025 The Race by betcha
Peaky Sneaky	World Of Rock	Rocknroll Hanover	Breeders Crown 3YO Filly Pace, Glen Garsey and Bluegrass Stakes.
Scarlett Hanover	Sammy's Magic Girl	Western Hanover (USA)	ONSS Champion at 2 year old and 3 year old. O'Brien pacing filly of the year at 2.
Self Assured	Star Of Venus	Christian Cullen	2019 and 2021 Auckland Pacing Cup and 2020 New Zealand Trotting Cup and 2022 The Race by Grins.
Silver Label	Hidden Gem	Real Desire (USA)	Champlain Stake and multiple ONTSS.
Southwind Tempo	Tsunami Hanover	Artspace	Winner of the 2008 and 2009 Betsy Ross Mares Invitational Pace, the Breeders Crown Elimination, 2007 James Lynch Memorial Final and Tender Loving Care Final
Tall Dark Stranger	Precocious Beauty	Art Major	Winner of 2020 Cane Pace, North American Cup and Meadowlands Pace. Dan Patch Award Horse and Pacer of the Year in 2020.
Tiger Tara	Tara Gold	Dream Away (USA)	2018 Inter Dominion Pacing Championship, 2019 A G Hunter Cup and 2019 Australian Harness Horse of the Year.
Ultimate Sniper	Reality Check	Armbro Operative (USA)	2019 Inter Dominion Pacing Championship.

== See also ==
- Harness racing in New Zealand
