= Sweet Lou (horse) =

American Standardbred racehorse

Sweet Lou (foaled 2009) is a retired Standardbred Champion Pacing Stallion in the sport of harness racing. He was sired by Yankee Cruiser and out of the mare Sweet Future. In a two-year-old season in which Sweet Lou won ten of his twelve starts, he capped it off with a 7½ length win in the Breeders Crown 2YO Colt & Gelding Pace in a World Record time of 1:49 flat for the mile. He was voted the 2011 American Champion Two-Year-Old Male Pacer. He went on to a highly successful career in racing and added the 2014 American Champion Male Pacer and American Pacer of the Year awards to his résumé. Sweet Lou is the only horse in history to win six straight mile races in times faster than 1:48.

== Racing career ==
Sweet Lou won the 2011 Breeders Crown 2YO Colt & Gelding Pace. In 2013, he won the Ben Franklin Free-For-All Pace at Pocono Downs in which he set a new track and World Record for a 5/8 mile track with a time of 1:47 flat. Among his other major wins, Sweet Lou won the 2014 TVG Free For All Pace, U.S. Pacing Championship, William R. Haughton Memorial Pace and, in track record time, the Dan Patch Invitational Pace. He retired from racing after his five-year-old season having earned $3,478,894. He was sent to stand at stud at Diamond Creek Farm in Pennsylvania and at Woodlands Stud in New Zealand.
