= Bolt The Duer =

American Standardbred racehorse

- Breed: Standardbred
- Sire: Ponder
- Grandsire: The Panderosa
- Dam: Wonderbolt
- Damsire: Artsplace
- Sex: Stallion
- Foaled: 2009
- Country: United States
- Colour: Bay
- Breeder: Peninsula Farm (Carter Duer)
- Owner: All Star Racing Inc. (John Como Sr. & Jr.)
- Trainer: Peter Foley
- Record: 67: 23-
- Earnings: $1,828,995

Major wins
- Messenger Stakes (2012); Adios Pace (2012); Kentucky Sires Stakes (2yo) (2011); Kentucky Sires Stakes (3yo) (2012); Cleveland Classic Stakes (2012); John Simpson Memorial Pace (2012); Dan Patch Invitational Pace (2013); Joe Gerrity Jr. Memorial Free-For-All Pace (2013); Pocono Downs Preferred Pace (2014); Robert J. Kane Memorial Invitational Pace (2014)
- Last updated on 5 October 2016

Bolt The Duer (foaled 2009) is a bay Standardbred racehorse who set or equaled two World Records for one mile.

== Racing career ==
Bolt The Duer was bred at Carter Duer's Peninsula Farm in Lexington, Kentucky and would be purchased for $70,000 at the 2010 Harrisburg Yearling Sale. He was trained for owners John Como Sr. and John Jr. by Australian native Peter Foley for whom he won six of eight starts and $214,058 while competing as a two-year-old. He has won 23 different races, including the Kentucky Sire Stakes.

=== Triple Crown races ===
On November 10, 2012, Bolt The Duer won the 57th edition of the Messenger Stakes, the third leg of the Pacing Triple Crown run that year at Yonkers Raceway. Driven by former Canadian driving champion Mark MacDonald, Bolt The Duer's winning time of 1:51 2/5 for the mile was the fastest time for the Messenger Stakes when held at that racetrack.

=== World records ===
On July 28, 2012 at The Meadows Racetrack three-year-old Bolt The Duer won the Adios Pace with Mark MacDonald driving. His winning time of 1:47 4/5 was a new world record for one mile on a 5/8 mile oval.

At age four, in the Ben Franklin Consolation at Pocono Downs, Bolt The Duer posted another win in 1:47 4/5 to make him the first horse in harness racing history to record wins in two sub-1:48 times over a five-eighths mile track. He would also equal a second world record for a half-mile track with a time of 1:49 while winning the Joe Gerrity Jr. Memorial Free-For-All Pace at Saratoga Raceway.

== Retirement to stud ==
While preparing for the 2015 racing season, Bolt The Duer suffered a torn hind suspensory ligament and was retired. He stands at stud at Winbak Farm in Walden, New York. The first foal born from him was born at Winbank Farm in Maryland in 2017.
