= Stoner Creek Stud =

Coordinates: 38.2169°N 84.2266°W

Stoner Creek Stud was an American Thoroughbred horse breeding farm near Paris, Kentucky, originally owned by Chicago businessman John D. Hertz and his wife, Fannie Kesner Hertz (1881–1963).

In his early business years in Chicago, John Hertz owned a farm near Cary, Illinois. In the 1930s, he acquired a property in Woodland Hills, California, in the San Fernando Valley where he raised Thoroughbred racehorses. He purchased Stoner Creek Stud for breeding and training, and two of his horses went on to win the Kentucky Derby. His first came with Reigh Count in 1928 then with his son, Count Fleet, who won the 1943 American Triple Crown of Thoroughbred Racing. In the Blood-Horse magazine List of the Top 100 U.S. Racehorses of the 20th Century, Count Fleet was ranked #5. Hertz was part of the American syndicate that purchased the English stallion Blenheim who became an important American sire.

In 1954, John Hertz published a book, "The Racing Memoirs of John Hertz as told to Evan Shipman."

Prominent horses owned and raced by John/Fannie Hertz and major race wins:

Reigh Count

- Kentucky Derby (1928)
- Jockey Club Gold Cup (1928)

Valenciennes

- Ladies Handicap

Count Arthur

- Manhattan Handicap (1935)
- Jockey Club Gold Cup (1936)
- Saratoga Cup (1935, 1937)

Count Fleet

- Champagne Stakes (1942)
- Pimlico Futurity (1942)
- Wood Memorial (1943)
- Kentucky Derby (1943)
- Preakness Stakes (1943)
- Belmont Stakes (1943)

== Standardbred breeding ==
In 1964, Stoner Creek Stud was purchased by Norman S. Woolworth & David R Johnston who converted it to a standardbred breeding farm. Among the sires who stood for them was the outstanding pacing stallion Meadow Skipper as well as Nevele Pride and Henry T. Adios.

== Today ==
Since 1996 Stoner Creek Stud has operated as Hunterton Farm at Stoner Creek owned by Steve & Cindy Stewart.
