= Messenger Stakes =

- Class: Triple Crown
- Location: Yonkers Raceway; Yonkers, New York
- Inaugurated: 1955 (71 years ago)
- Race type: Standardbred
- Website: www.hambletonian.org/staking/messenger_stake.html

Race information
- Distance: 1 mile (8.0 furlongs)
- Surface: Dirt
- Track: Left-handed
- Qualification: 3-year-olds
- Purse: US$500,000

The Messenger Stakes is an American harness racing event for 3-year-old pacing horses. It was organized in 1956 at Roosevelt Raceway in Westbury, New York (on suburban Long Island) to join with the Cane Pace and the Little Brown Jug to create the Triple Crown of Harness Racing for Pacers. The race is named in honor of Messenger (1780–1808), a horse foaled in England and later brought to the United States. As a sire, virtually all harness horses in the U.S. can be traced back to Messenger.

One of the preeminent events for harness racing horses in North America, the race was held annually at Roosevelt Raceway until it closed down in 1988. From 1988 to 1994, the race changed locations several times, from Yonkers Raceway (Yonkers, New York) to Freestate Raceway to Rosecroft Raceway (both in Maryland). In 1995, it moved to The Meadows Racetrack in the Pittsburgh, Pennsylvania area. In 2004, the race was supposed to be moved back to Yonkers Raceway. However, due to construction at the track, the race was moved to Harrington Raceway in Delaware, where the event was held in 2004 and '05. The race moved back to Yonkers Raceway in November 2006. The 2015 edition was raced at Yonkers on September 5 for a total purse of US$500,000.

Much like the Little Brown Jug, the Messenger was raced in heat events, meaning a horse had to win an elimination heat and the final on the same day to be declared the winner. Starting from 2006 at Yonkers, there will be eliminations, if necessary, one week prior to the event.

In 2026, the race was contested at a distance of 1 1/4 miles instead of one mile.

== Locations ==
- 1956–1987 - Roosevelt Raceway
- 1988, 2006–present - Yonkers Raceway
- 1989 - Freestate Raceway
- 1990–1994 - Rosecroft Raceway
- 1995–2003 - The Meadows Racetrack and Casino
- 2004–2005 - Harrington Raceway & Casino

== Records ==
Most wins by a driver

- 8 – John Campbell (1986, 1987, 1990, 1994, 1995, 1998, 2000, 2004)

Most wins by a trainer

- 8 – Billy Haughton (1956, 1967, 1968, 1972, 1974, 1975, 1976, 1985)

Stakes record

- 1:50 3/5 – Allamerican Ingot (2002)

== Messenger Stakes winners ==
Year	Winner	Driver	Trainer	Owner	Time	Purse
2026	Fragment	Jason Bartlett	Per Engblom	Engblom Farm LLC, Douglas Sipple, Peaceful Acre Farm	2:21 4/5	$200,000
2025	Twisted Destiny	Dexter Dunn	Chris Ryder	Let It Ride Stables, Alberg Racing and Enviro Stables	1:51 2/5	$200,000
2024	Sweet Beach Life	Tyler Buter	Travis Alexander	A Sweet Beach Life Stable	1:53 1/5	$225,000
2023	Captain Batboy	Jordan Stratton	Tom Fanning	Joseph Smith	1:57 4/5	$250,000
2022	Pleaseletmeknow	Matt Kakaley	Travis Alexander	Fiddler's Creek Stables	1:51 3/5	$261,730
2021	American Courage	Matt Kakaley	Travis Alexander	Fiddler's Creek Stables	1:51 2/5	$500,000
2020	cancelled					
2019	American Mercury	Tyler Buter	Chris Oakes	Crawford Racing, Northfork Racing, Pompey & Bice	1:51 3/5	$500,000
2018	Stay Hungry	Doug McNair	Tony Alagna	Bradley Grant & Irwin Samelman	1:52 1/5	$500,000
2017	Downbytheseaside	Brian Sears	Brian Brown	Country Club Acres, Sbrocco, Lombardo & Diamond Creek	1:52 1/5	$500,000
2016	Racing Hill	Brett Miller	Tony Alagna	Tom Hill	1:53 0/0	$500,000
2015	Revenge Shark	Yannick Gingras	Tony Alagna	Alagna Racing & Bradley Grant	1:53 1/5	$500,000
2014	All Bets Off	Matt Kakaley	Ron Burke	Burke Racing, Weaver Bruscemi, et al.	1:51 1/5	$500,000
2013	Ronny Bugatti	Jason Bartlett	Allan Johnson	Eric Prevost, Bridget McNeese, Tom Haughton	1:51 4/5	$450,000
2012	Bolt The Duer	Mark J. MacDonald	Peter Foley	All Star Racing Inc. (John Como Sr. & Jr.)	1:51 2/5	$415,820
2011	Roll With Joe	Ronald Pierce	Edward Hart	Winbak Farm, Blue Chip Bloodstock, et al.	1:52 4/5	$401,000
2010	Rock N Roll Heaven	Daniel Dubé	Bruce Saunders	Frank Bellino	1:51 4/5	$437,100
2009	If I Can Dream	Tim Tetrick	Tracy Brainard	Bulletproof Enterprises	1:52 2/5	$542,060
2008	Somebeachsomewhere	Paul MacDonell	Brent MacGrath	Schooner Stables	1:52 1/5	$650,000
2007	Always A Virgin	Brian Sears	Joe Holloway	Bluestone Farms, et al.	1:52 0/0	$725,480
2006	Palone Ranger	Ronald Pierce	Gregory Peck	Four Friends & Perretti Racing Stables LLC	1:54 3/5	$546,830
2005	Gryffindor	David Miller	Brendan Johnson	Jim Winske, Bill Donovan, Milt Leeman	1:52 0/0	$218,475
2004	Metropolitan	John Campbell	Christopher J. Ryder	Norman &Gerald Smiley	1:52 2/5	$340,950
2003	No Pan Intended	David Miller	Ivan Sugg	Peter Pan Stables Inc. (Robert Glazer)	1:52 4/5	$252,945
2002	Allamerican Ingot	David Miller	Robert McIntosh	Robert Waxman	1:50 3/5	$260,610
2001	Bagel Beach Boy	Luc Ouellette	Jim Campbell	Lloyd F. Arnold	1:52 1/5	$254,385
2000	Ain't No Stoppin' Him	John Campbell	Joe Holloway	John & Patricia Celli	1:52 3/5	$323,421
1999	Blissfull Hall	Ronald Pierce	Benjamin Wallace	Daniel Plouffe	1:51 1/5	$347,760
1998	Fit For Life	John Campbell	Brett Pelling	Brittany Farms & Val D'Or Farms	1:52 2/5	$387,380
1997	Western Dreamer	Michel Lachance	Nathaniel C. Varty	Matthew, Patrick & Daniel Daly	1:51 3/5	$331,300
1996	Go For Grins	Dave Palone	Christopher J. Ryder		1:52 2/5	$333,080
1995	David's Pass	John Campbell	Brett Pelling	RJS Stable	1:52 4/5	$328,825
1994	Cam's Card Shark	John Campbell	William G. Robinson	Jeffrey S. Snyder	1:51 0/0	$342,595
1993	Riyadh	Jim Morrill Jr.	William G. Robinson	R. Peter Heffering	1:52 2/5	$328,305
1992	Western Hanover	William Fahy	Gene Riegle	George Segal	1:53 1/5	$366,750
1991	Die Laughing	Richard Silverman	Roger Goldstein	Alnoff Stable & Val D'Or Farms	1:51 1/5	$475,000
1990	Jake And Elwood	John Campbell	Ken Seeber	Louis P. Guida	1:52 3/5	$444,371
1989	Sandman Hanover	Bill O'Donnell	Ken Seeber	LPG Standardbred & MRF Racing Stable	1:53 2/5	$451,069
1988	Matt's Scooter	Michel Lachance	Harry J. Poulton	Gordon & Illa Rumpel, Charles Juravinski	1:56 3/5	$461,310
1987	Redskin	John Campbell	Jerry Smith	Jerry Smith	1:58 0/0	$447,310
1986	Amity Chef	John Campbell	Blair Burgess	Cantario Farms, Blair Burgess, Bland & Baugh	1:55 4/5	$363,762
1985	Pershing Square	Bill O'Donnell	Billy Haughton	Louis P. Guida	1:55 2/5	$483,560
1984	Troublemaker	Bill O'Donnell	Gene Riegle	George Segal	1:57 3/5	$379,343
1983	Ralph Hanover	Ron Waples	Stewart Firlotte	Ron Waples, Pointsetta Stables, Grants Direct Stables	1:57 0/0	$379,004
1982	Cam Fella	Pat Crowe	Pat Crowe	Norman Clements & Norman Faulkner	1:57 3/5	$259,578
1981	Seahawk Hanover	Ben Webster	Samuel Lewis	Dave Harris, Samuel Lewis, et al.	1:58 0/0	$224,955
1980	Niatross	Clint Galbraith	Clint Galbraith	Niatross Syndicate	1:59 3/5	$173,522
1979	Hot Hitter	Henri Filion	Louis Meittinis	Solomon Katz, S A J & Alterman Stables	1:59 4/5	$180,225
1978	Abercrombie	Glen Garnsey	Glen Garnsey	L. Keith Bulen & Shirley A. Mitchell	1:58 2/5	$167,682
1977	Governor Skipper	John Chapman	H. "Bucky" Norris	Ivanhoe Stable	1:59 1/5	$159,155
1976	Windshield Wiper	Billy Haughton	Billy Haughton	Irving G. Liverman	2:00 0/0	$161,920
1975	Bret's Champ	Billy Haughton	Billy Haughton	Edward W. Andrews	1:59 1/5	$154,222
1974	Armbro Omaha	Billy Haughton	Billy Haughton	J. Elgin Armstrong	1:59 3/5	$151,043
1973	Valiant Bret	Lucien Fontaine	Harry Tudor	P.G. & Jere Gray	2:00 3/5	$122,732
1972	Silent Majority	Billy Haughton	Billy Haughton	Irving G. Liverman & Aline White	2:01 4/5	$154,733
1971	Albatross	Stanley Dancer	Stanley Dancer	Amicable Stable	2:00 2/5	$114,977
1970	Most Happy Fella	Stanley Dancer	Stanley Dancer	Egyptian Acres Stable	2:02 3/5	$123,450
1969	Bye Bye Sam	Stanley Dancer	Stanley Dancer	Jane Falley Galt	2:02 3/5	$182,976
1968	Rum Customer	Billy Haughton	Billy Haughton	Louis & Connie Manucuso & Kennilworth Farm	2:01 4/5	$189,018
1967	Romulus Hanover	Billy Haughton	Billy Haughton	Farmstead Acres Farm	1:59 1/5	$178,064
1966	Romeo Hanover	George Sholty	Jerry Silverman	Lucky Star Stables & Morton Finder	2:01 0/0	$169,885
1965	Bret Hanover	Frank Ervin	Frank Ervin	Richard Downing	2:02 0/0	$151,252
1964	Race Time	Ralph N. Baldwin	Ralph N. Baldwin	Castleton Farm	2:01 2/5	$150,960
1963	Overtrick	John F. Patterson Sr.	John F. Patterson Sr.	Allwood Stable (Leonard & Helen Buck)	2:00 4/5	$146,324
1962	Thor Hanover	John F. Simpson Sr.	John F. Simpson Sr.	J. F. Simpson Sr., T. W. Murphy, Lawrence B. & C. N. Shepherd	2:01 1/5	$169,430
1961	Adios Don	Robert Camper	Robert Camper	Harold Large	2:02 4/5	$145,377
1960	Countess Adios	Delvin Miller	Delvin Miller	J. Elgin & Ted Armstrong & Hugh A. Grant Sr.	2:02 1/5	$142,786
1959	Adios Butler	Clint Hodgins	Clint Hodgins	Paige West & Angelo Pellillo	2:00 1/5	$110,994
1958	O'Brien Hanover	James W. Jordan	Delvin Miller	Hugh A. Grant Sr.	2:01 4/5	$108,565
1957	Meadow Lands	Delvin Miller	Delvin Miller	Hugh A. Grant Sr. & Del Miller	2:04 4/5	$100,084
1956	Belle Action	Billy Haughton	Billy Haughton	Billy Haughton	2:01 2/5	$71,500
