= Bluegrass Stakes =

- Location: Lexington, Kentucky
- Inaugurated: 1975
- Race type: Harness race for standardbred trotters
- Website: Red Mile

Race information
- Distance: 1 mile (1,609 metres or 8 furlongs)
- Surface: Dirt, 1 mile oval
- Track: The Red Mile
- Qualification: Two-year-old colts & geldings
- Purse: $330,000 (2016)

The Bluegrass Stakes is a Standardbred harness race for two-year-old colt and gelding trotters run annually over The Red Mile at Lexington, Kentucky. Due to a large number of entrants, the 2016 race was divided into five divisions, each with a purse of $66,000.

There is also a Bluegrass Stakes for two-year-old trotting fillies.
