= American Harness Horse of the Year =

American horse racing award

Dan Patch Horse of the Year
- Sport: Harness racing
- Awarded for: Best racehorse of the year
- Country: United States
- Presented by: United States Harness Writers Association

History
- First award: 1947
- First winner: Victory Song
- Most recent: Beau Jangles

The Harness Horse of the Year is an honor recognizing the top harness racing horse in the United States. The award is selected by the United States Harness Writers Association (USHWA), which issues the annual Dan Patch Awards.

The inaugural honor was awarded to Victory Song of Castleton Farms Stables, named the "Harness Horse of 1947" by a committee that consisted of 50 harness racing writers, radio commentators, and sports editors. Victory Song picked up 23 first-place votes, to lead a field of 22 horses that had been nominated for the honor, edging stablemate Hoot Mon, which finished second in the balloting. Victory Song had set the harness racing record for stallions with a time of 1:57.6 in the mile. E. Roland Harriman, president of the Trotting Horse Club of America, announced the award and indicated that the enthusiasm shown for the honor led to the decision to make the "Harness Horse of the Year" an annual event.

Good Time became the first horse to win the honor two times, winning in both 1949 and 1952. Good Time held the single-season money record at the time of $110,299 and received 80 first-place votes from the 99 writers participating in that year's balloting, after finishing first in 23 starts in 1952, with three second-place finishes and two finishes in third.

In 1956, Scott Frost became the first horse to win the Harness of the Year honors in consecutive years, earning the first place on the ballots of 66 of the 95 writers participating that year. Driven by Joe O'Brien, Scott Frost won 18 of 21 starts in 1956, and came in second in the three other races.

In 2022, Bulldog Hanover became the first unanimous choice for Horse of the Year, receiving all 136 votes, after a season in which he became the fastest harness horse in history with a mile of 1:45.4 at The Meadowlands and won nine major stakes races. He also became the third horse to win the Stanley F. Bergstein Proximity-Achievement Award, the highest honor voted on by USHWA.

== Past winners ==
Horses that have been recognized as Harness Horse of the Year are:

| ^ | Also named Canadian Horse of the Year (first awarded 1989) |
| † | Member of the United States Harness Racing Hall of Fame |
| * | Member of the Canadian Horse Racing Hall of Fame |
| § | Unanimous selection |

| Year | Horse | Gait |
|---|---|---|
| 1947 | Victory Song † | Trotter |
| 1948 | Rodney † | Trotter |
| 1949 | Good Time † | Pacer |
| 1950 | Proximity † | Trotter |
| 1951 | Pronto Don † | Trotter |
| 1952 | Good Time (2) † | Pacer |
| 1953 | Hi Lo's Forbes | Pacer |
| 1954 | Stenographer † | Trotter |
| 1955 | Scott Frost † | Trotter |
| 1956 | Scott Frost (2) † | Trotter |
| 1957 | Torpid | Pacer |
| 1958 | Emily's Pride † | Trotter |
| 1959 | Bye Bye Byrd † | Pacer |
| 1960 | Adios Butler † | Pacer |
| 1961 | Adios Butler (2) † | Pacer |
| 1962 | Su Mac Lad † | Trotter |
| 1963 | Speedy Scot † | Trotter |
| 1964 | Bret Hanover † | Pacer |
| 1965 | Bret Hanover (2) † | Pacer |
| 1966 | Bret Hanover (3) † | Pacer |
| 1967 | Nevele Pride † | Trotter |
| 1968 | Nevele Pride (2) † | Trotter |
| 1969 | Nevele Pride (3) † | Trotter |
| 1970 | Fresh Yankee †* | Trotter |
| 1971 | Albatross †* | Pacer |
| 1972 | Albatross (2) †* | Pacer |
| 1973 | Sir Dalrae | Pacer |
| 1974 | Delmonica Hanover † | Trotter |
| 1975 | Savoir † | Trotter |
| 1976 | Keystone Ore | Pacer |
| 1977 | Green Speed † | Trotter |
| 1978 | Abercrombie † | Pacer |
| 1979 | Niatross †* | Pacer |
| 1980 | Niatross (2) †* | Pacer |
| 1981 | Fan Hanover †* | Pacer |
| 1982 | Cam Fella †* | Pacer |
| 1983 | Cam Fella (2) †* | Pacer |
| 1984 | Fancy Crown | Trotter |
| 1985 | Nihilator † | Pacer |
| 1986 | Forrest Skipper | Pacer |
| 1987 | Mack Lobell † | Trotter |
| 1988 | Mack Lobell (2) † | Trotter |
| 1989 | Matt's Scooter ^†* | Pacer |
| 1990 | Beach Towel † | Pacer |
| 1991 | Precious Bunny ^†* | Pacer |
| 1992 | Artsplace ^†* | Pacer |
| 1993 | Staying Together ^ | Pacer |
| 1994 | Cam's Card Shark † | Pacer |
| 1995 | CR Kay Suzie | Trotter |
| 1996 | Continentalvictory † | Trotter |
| 1997 | Malabar Man † | Trotter |
| 1998 | Moni Maker † | Trotter |
| 1999 | Moni Maker (2) † | Trotter |
| 2000 | Gallo Blue Chip † | Pacer |
| 2001 | Bunny Lake † | Pacer |
| 2002 | Real Desire ^†* | Pacer |
| 2003 | No Pan Intended | Pacer |
| 2004 | Rainbow Blue ^† | Pacer |
| 2005 | Rocknroll Hanover †* | Pacer |
| 2006 | Glidemaster | Trotter |
| 2007 | Donato Hanover † | Trotter |
| 2008 | Somebeachsomewhere ^†* | Pacer |
| 2009 | Muscle Hill ^† | Trotter |
| 2010 | Rock N Roll Heaven † | Pacer |
| 2011 | San Pail ^* | Trotter |
| 2012 | Chapter Seven † | Trotter |
| 2013 | Bee A Magician ^† | Trotter |
| 2014 | JK She'salady ^ | Pacer |
| 2015 | Wiggle It Jiggleit | Pacer |
| 2016 | Always B Miki † | Pacer |
| 2017 | Hannelore Hanover ^† | Trotter |
| 2018 | McWicked ^†* | Pacer |
| 2019 | Shartin N | Pacer |
| 2020 | Tall Dark Stranger | Pacer |
| 2021 | Test of Faith | Pacer |
| 2022 | Bulldog Hanover ^*§ | Pacer |
| 2023 | Confederate | Pacer |
| 2024 | Twin B Joe Fresh | Pacer |
| 2025 | Beau Jangles^ | Pacer |
