= Nihilator =

American Standardbred racehorse

- Breed: Standardbred
- Sire: Niatross (US)
- Grandsire: Albatross (US)
- Dam: Margie's Melody
- Damsire: Bret Hanover
- Sex: Stallion
- Foaled: 1982
- Died: November 1991
- Country: United States
- Color: Bay
- Owner: Wall Street Stable
- Trainer: Billy Haughton
- Record: 38:35-1-1
- Earnings: US$3,225,754

Major wins
- Woodrow Wilson Pace (1984); Little Brown Jug (1985); Meadowlands Pace (1985); James Dancer Memorial (1985); Tattersalls Pace (1985); Walt Whitman Pace (1985); Breeders Crown 3-Year-Old Colt/Gelding Pace (1985)

Awards
- 2 Year Old Colt Pacer of the Year (1984); 3 Year Old Colt Pacer of the Year (1985); United States Pacer of the Year (1985); United States Harness Horse of the Year (1985)

Honors
- United States Harness Racing Hall of Fame (1995)
- Last updated on 2016-02-22

Nihilator (1982–1991) was an American champion Standardbred racehorse and was the United States Harness Horse of the Year in 1985. The first standardbred to win $3 million, at the time of his retirement he was the leading stakes earning pacer in harness racing history.

== Racing career ==
As a two-year-old in 1984, Nihilator won his first twelve races before finishing second behind Dragon's Lair in the Breeders Crown. His winning streak included a win in the Woodrow Wilson Pace, a race that was the richest run for either the Thoroughbred or Standardbred breed at the time. His winning time of 1:52 4/5 was a world record for a two-year-old pacer. He was the 2-Year Old Colt Pacer of the Year for 1984.

Early in 1985 a 30 percent interest in Nihilator was sold for $5.76m to Almahurst Farm. He won the 1985 Meadowlands Pace by 7 1/4 lengths equalling the world record for a pacer of any age with a time of 1:50 3/5. The last half mile was covered in 54 seconds. It was Nihilator's 18th win from 19 races. In the Adios Pace at The Meadows Nihilator was surprisingly beaten in the first heat by Marauder, won the second heat and was scratched from the race-off. Nihilator had bettered his Meadowlands Pace winning time when he won a race in 1:49 3/5 at The Meadowlands setting world record for the fastest race ever with quarter mile splits of 26 2/5, 53 4/5 and 1:21 2/5 before attempting to break the world record of 1:49 1/5 set by his sire Niatross in a time trial in 1980. In his time trial at Springfield he slowed running into a head wind in the last quarter mile running a time of 1:50 4/5.

Nihilator started in the 1985 Little Brown Jug less than a week after winning the James Dancer Memorial at Freehold Raceway. It was his first start on a half mile track. Nihilator took the Jug with heat wins in 1:53 1/5 and 1:52 1/5. On the same day Falcon Seelster won a race recording a half mile track world record mile of 1:51. Nihilator scored an easy win in the Walt Whitman Pace before he ended his racing career with a win in the Breeders Crown at Garden State Park. For 1985 he won 23 of 25 starts and also won the Tattersalls Pace and Bluegrass Stake. In his career Nihilator won 35 of 38 races and $3,225,754. He was the first Standardbred to earn $3 million.

In 1995, Nihilator United States Harness Racing Hall of Fame

Nihilator was humanely destroyed in November 1991 after suffering from Potomac horse fever and laminitis.
