= Albatross (horse) =

American Standardbred racehorse

- Breed: Standardbred
- Sire: Meadow Skipper (USA)
- Grandsire: Dale Frost (USA)
- Dam: Voodoo Hanover (USA)
- Damsire: Dancer Hanover(USA)
- Sex: Stallion
- Foaled: May 8, 1968
- Died: August 5, 1998
- Country: United States
- Colour: Bay
- Breeder: C & J Kenney, M Lydon, J Wilcutts (USA)
- Trainer: Harry Harvey (driver); 2. Stanley Dancer
- Record: 71:59–8–3
- Earnings: $1,201,477

Major wins
- Lawrence Sheppard Pace (1970); Roosevelt Futurity (1970); Adios Pace (1971); Cane Pace (1971); Messenger Stakes (1971); American Pacing Classic (1971, 1972); Prix d'Été (1971); National Pacing Derby (1972); Canadian Pacing Derby (1972)

Awards
- 1970 USA 2 Year Old Colt Pacer of the Year; 1971, 1972 United States Harness Horse of the Year; 1971 USA 3 Year Old Colt Pacer of the Year; 1972 USA Aged Pacer of the Year; 1970 Canadian Harness Horse of the Year

Honors
- Hall Of Fame Immortal; Living Hall Of Fame; Canadian Horse Racing Hall of Fame; Best mile rate: 1:54.3; Leading Standardbred Sire in North America (1981–84 & 1986); Leading Standardbred Broodmare Sire in North America (1987–2000)
- Last updated on July 29, 2011

Albatross (1968–1998) was a bay Standardbred horse by Meadow Skipper. He was voted United States Harness Horse of the Year in 1971 and 1972. Albatross won 59 of 71 starts, including the Cane Pace and Messenger Stakes in 1971, earned $1,201,477. It was, however, as a sire that he really made his mark. Albatross's 2,546 sons and daughters won $130,700,280.

== Racing career ==
Trained and driven by Harry Harvey from the time he was a yearling until a week before his three-year-old season and later Stanley Dancer, he won 14 of 17 starts at age two in 1970 including wins in the Lawrence Sheppard Pace, Roosevelt Futurity, Star Pointer Pace and Fox Stakes.

Early in 1972 he was syndicated for $1.25 million and Stanley Dancer became his trainer. He won 25 of his 28 races as a three-year-old, including the Adios Pace, the Cane Pace, the Messenger Stakes, Battle Of The Brandywine, Prix d'Été, Shapiro Stakes and the American Classic against older horses. As a three-year-old he also set a record for fastest race mile with two races in 1:54.4 at The Red Mile in Lexington, Kentucky. It was the first time a horse and set and equalled or lowered a world record the same day. He was denied the Triple Crown when beaten in the Little Brown Jug by Nansemond.

He broke his world record as a four-year-old with a race in 1:54.3 at Sportsman's Park in Chicago. Also in 1973 he won the Canadian Pacing Derby, National Pacing Derby, Realization Park and the American Classic for a second time.

Albatross set the single-season harness horse earnings record of $558,009 in 1971. and was the sports richest horse at the time of his retirement.

== Stud record ==
After his four-year-old racing season he retired to stud at Hanover Shoe Farms in Hanover, Pennsylvania. One of his sons Niatross was the winner of the Triple Crown of Harness Racing for Pacers in 1980 and in that year was also a world champion with a mark of 1:49.1. Others were Fan Hanover, Merger, Colt Fortysix, and Jaguar Spur, all, like Niatross, winners of the Little Brown Jug. His sons and daughters made him the all-time leading stakeswinning sire. He was also an outstanding broodmare sire.

In 1998, Albatross died at the age of 30 at Hanover Shoe Farm in Pennsylvania of complications from heart failure and colic. He was buried at the Hanover Shoe Farms horse cemetery.

== Sire line tree ==
- Albatross
  - Niatross
    - Nihilator

== See also ==
- Harness racing
- List of racehorses
