= Adios Pace =

Horse race held in Pennsylvania, US

- Location: Hollywood Casino at The Meadows, North Strabane Township, Pennsylvania
- Inaugurated: 1967; 59 years ago
- Race type: Standardbred pacers
- Website: www.meadowsgaming.com/racing

Race information
- Distance: 1 mile (8.0 furlongs)
- Surface: Dirt
- Track: Left-handed
- Qualification: 3-year-olds
- Purse: $400,000 (2016)

The Adios Pace is a horse race for three-year-old Standardbred colts and geldings run annually since 1967 at a distance of one mile at Meadows Racetrack in North Strabane Township, Pennsylvania.

== Historical race events ==
The 1972 race final was the only time the Adios Pace ended in a dead heat. In 1997 the race was renamed the Delvin Miller Adios Pace to honor the legendary Hall of Fame driver/trainer Delvin Miller. 1997 also saw the only winner disqualification in the race's history when Dream Away finished first by five lengths but was disqualified for interference. In 1985, Nihilator won a division of the Adios Pace but was withdrawn from the final which would have been a match race against Marauder. To win, Marauder merely jogged around the track alone. For 2008 the race was moved to Pocono Downs in Wilkes-Barre, Pennsylvania due to construction work at The Meadows.

== Records ==
Speed record: (1 mile on a 5/8 mile oval)

- 1:47 4/5 - Bolt The Duer (2012) (New world record)

Most wins by a driver:

- 8 - John Campbell (1984, 1987, 1992, 1993, 1994, 1995, 2002, 2003)

Most wins by a trainer:

- 4 - Brett Pelling (1995, 1996, 2004, 2005)

== Adios Pace winners ==
Year	Winner	Driver	Trainer	Owner	Time	Purse
1967	Romulus Hanover	Billy Haughton	Billy Haughton	Farmstead Acres Farm	2:00 3/5	$85,510
1968	Bye and Large	George Sholty	Billy Haughton	Mr. & Mrs. Lloyd Lloyds	2:00 1/5	$93,320
1969	Laverne Hanover	Billy Haughton	Billy Haughton	Thomas W. Murphy, Jr.	2:01 0/0	$88,970
1970	Most Happy Fella	Stanley Dancer	Stanley Dancer	Egyptian Acres Stable	2:19 1/5	$86,740
1971	Albatross	Stanley Dancer	Stanley Dancer	Amicable Stable	1:58 3/5	$88,800
1972 (dh)	Strike Out; Jay Time	Keith Waples; Gene Riegle	John Hayes; Gene Riegle	Beejay Stable; Mr. & Mrs. Carl C. Bass	1:58 1/5	$92,110
1973	Ricci Rennie Time	Harold Dancer, Jr.	Harold Dancer, Jr.		2:00 2/5	$86,780
1974	Armbro Omaha	Billy Haughton	Billy Haughton	Armstrong Bros.	1:58 0/0	$104,350
1975	Nero	Joe O'Brien	Joe O'Brien	R. Derveas, Jr., J. Massau, J. Crane, Stoner Creek Stud	1:57 3/5	$111,645
1976	Armbro Ranger	Joe O'Brien	Joe O'Brien	J. Elgin Armstrong	1:56 0/0	$124,141
1977	Governor Skipper	John Chapman	H. "Bucky" Norris	Ivanhoe Stable	1:54 4/5	$120,450
1978	Abercrombie	Glen Garnsey	Glen Garnsey	L. Keith Bulen & Shirley A. Mitchell	1:55 0/0	$128,663
1979	Hot Hitter	Hervé Filion	Louis Meittinis	Alterman Stables, Inc./SAJ Ranch, Ltd./Soloman Katz	1:57 0/0	$150,000
1980	Storm Damage	Joe O'Brien	Jerry Smith	Jerry & Betty Smith & Castleton Farm	1:53 2/5	$150,000
1981	Landslide	Ed Lohmeyer	Ed Lohmeyer	Landslide Stable	1:57 2/5	$155,000
1982	Higher Power	Myles "Mickey" McNichol	Ron Gurfein	Peter Rhulen & Pearl Kapz	1:54 0/0	$206,000
1983	Ralph Hanover	Ron Waples	Stewart Firlotte	Ron Waples, Pointsetta Stables, Grants Direct Stables	1:54 4/5	$242,000
1984	Andrel	John Campbell	James Crane	James & Pauline Crane	1:54 2/5	$250,586
1985	Marauder	Dick Richardson, Jr.	Dick Richardson, Jr.	Alvin Tolin	2:27 1/5	$242,400
1986	Barberry Spur	Richard Stillings	Richard Stillings	Roy Davis & Barberry Farms	1:53 1/5	$233,450
1987	Run The Table	John Campbell	Jim Campbell	Dalona Stables	1:53 2/5	$240,076
1988	Camtastic	William O'Donnell	Robert Bencal	Dreamaire Racing Corp.	1:53 3/5	$277,055
1989	Goalie Jeff	Michel Lachance	Tom Artandi	Centre Ice Stable	1:54 2/5	$275,045
1990	Beach Towel	Ray Remmen	Larry Remmen	Uptown Stable	1:51 4/5	$493,176
1991	Precious Bunny	Jack Moiseyev	William Robinson	R. Peter Heffering	1:50 4/5	$428,880
1992	Direct Flight	John Campbell	Kelvin Harrison	Joe Alflen	1:52 0/0	$256,308
1993	Miles McCool	John Campbell	Thomas Haughton	Thomas Walsh, Jr.	1:51 2/5	$254,160
1994	Cam's Card Shark	John Campbell	William Robinson	Jeffrey Snyder	1:51 1/5	$256,512
1995	David's Pass	John Campbell	Brett Pelling	RJS Stable	1:51 4/5	$264,768
1996	Electric Yankee	Michel Lachance	Brett Pelling	Charles E. Keller III, et al.	1:52 1/5	$163,852
1997	Legacy of Power	Dan Ross	Jerry Ross, Sr.	Ross family	1:52 1/5	$196,248
1998	Artist Stena	Luc Ouelette	Ross Croghan	Ecurie Stena	1:51 1/5	$200,000
1999	Washington VC	Dave Palone	Ronald Coyne, Jr.	Richard Bolte	1:52 3/5	$284,331
2000	Riverboat King	Mark Kesmodel	Steve Elliott	Golden Touch Stable	1:51 4/5	$257,115
2001	Pine Valley	Brian Sears	David Knight	Edward Franz, John Knight, Daniel Miller, et al.	1:51 4/5	$272,547
2002	Million Dollar Cam	John Campbell	William Robinson	Jeffrey Snyder & R. Peter Heffering	1:50 4/5	$300,000
2003	Armbro Animate	John Campbell	Jim Campbell	Arlene & Jules Siegel	1:52 2/5	$265,416
2004	Timesareachanging	Ronald Pierce	Brett Pelling	Perfect World Enterprises	1:49 3/5	$350,350
2005	Village Jolt	Ronald Pierce	Brett Pelling	Jeffrey Snyder & Arlene & Jules Siegel	1:52 1/5	$321,800
2006	Cactus Creek	Michel Lachance	Ervin M. Miller	Brittany Farms, Val D'or Farms, Stanley Friedman	1:50 2/5	$300,000
2007	May June Character	George Brennan	Mickey Burke	Sandy Goldfarb & A Bunch Of Characters II	1:51 1/5	$320,125
2008	Shadow Play	David Miller	Mark Ford	Ian Moore, R G McGroup Ltd, Serge Savard	1:50 4/5	$350,000
2009	Vintage Master	Daniel Dubé	Jimmy Takter	Brittany Farms & Estate of Brian Monieson	1:49 2/5	$677,664
2010	Delmarvalous	Brian Sears	George Teague, Jr.	George Teague, Jr., Badlands Racing, et al.	1:49 4/5	$500,000
2011	Alsace Hanover	Ronald Pierce	Tony O'Sullivan	John Fielding	1:48 3/5	$500,000
2012	Bolt The Duer	Mark J. MacDonald	Peter Foley	All Star Racing Inc.	1:47 4/5	$500,000
2013	Sunfire Blue Chip	Yannick Gingras	Jimmy Takter	Christina Takter, John & Jim Fielding, et al.	1:48 3/5	$500,000
2014	McWicked	David Miller	Casie Coleman	SSG Stables	1:49 1/5	$400,000
2015	Dudes The Man	Corey Callahan	Jessica Okusko	M&L of Delaware & Victoria Dickinson	1:48 4/5	$400,000
2016	Racing Hill	Brett Miller	Tony Alagna	Tom Hill	1:48 4/5	$400,000
2017	Fear The Dragon	David Miller	Brian Brown	Emerald Highlands Farm	1:49 1/5	$400,000
2018	Dorsoduro Hanover	Matt Kakaley	Ron Burke	Burke Racing Stable LLC, Silva, Purnel & Libby, Weaver Bruscemi LLC, Wingfield Five LLC	1:50 1/5	$400,000
2019	Southwind Ozzi	Brian Sears	Bill Mackenzie	Vincent Ali and Alma Iafelice	1:48	$400,000
