= Buffalo Driving Park =

Harness racing track in Buffalo, New York

- Former names: Buffalo Trotting Park
- Location: Buffalo, New York, U.S.
- Owner: Buffalo Driving Park Association
- Operator: Cicero J. Hamlin and associates
- Surface: Dirt
- Main venue: Harness racing

Construction
- Opened: 1868
- Closed: 1896

The Buffalo Driving Park was a harness racing venue in Buffalo, New York, United States. Established in 1868, it was among the original tracks associated with the Grand Circuit. The park was closely associated with businessman and horse breeder Cicero J. Hamlin and racing official Elisha A. Buck.

== History ==
=== Founding and early years ===
In the spring of 1866, a group of prominent businessmen from Buffalo, New York organized what became known as the Buffalo Driving Park Association. By September 1866, the development of a driving park attracted $38,000 in subscriptions, with plans calling for separate facilities for recreational driving and horse racing. The racetrack was also intended to accommodate agricultural and horticultural fairs, livestock exhibitions, and other events. An organizational meeting was called by Buffalo mayor Chandler J. Wells and held on October 15, 1866. Edward L. Stevenson chaired the meeting while J. M. Hutchinson served as secretary. Wells proposed the establishment of a three-member committee responsible for nominating seven directors to the Buffalo Driving Park Company. The first board of directors consisted of E. L. Stevenson, Myron P. Bush, Rufus L. Howard, Frank Perew, Cicero J. Hamlin, Isaac Holloway, and J. M. Hutchinson. At a meeting of the directors, Stevenson was subsequently elected the board's president, Rufus L. Howard treasurer, and Joseph Warren secretary.

The company was incorporated as the Buffalo Park Company by an act of the New York State Legislature on April 10, 1867. Its authorized capital was $100,000. The legislation permitted the company to acquire between 80 and 300 acres of land in Buffalo for a driving park, racetrack, and exhibition grounds.

Members of the Buffalo Park Co. purchased an existing half-mile track from "Pop" Hortor and George Hosley for $300 per acre. Among those involved were Cicero J. Hamlin, Chandler J. Wells, Myron P. Bush, Sherman S. Jewett, and General R. L. Howard. The racecourse occupied a tract near East Ferry Street. Its facilities included a half-mile racing track, grandstands, and stables. The Buffalo Driving Park was developed as a harness racing track and polo grounds in 1868. The original course was subsequently replaced by a mile-long track. The grounds of Buffalo Driving Park underwent extensive improvements, including the construction of a covered grandstand seating 2,000 spectators, a two-story clubhouse, and a separate 113-foot stand with private boxes. The newly-developed grounds featured a new carriage entrance at the southeastern corner of the property. Visitors could reach the park by horse-drawn omnibus connecting with the Main Street railway. Additional developments included an exercise track and a landscaped area adjoining the grandstands.

The Buffalo Driving Park was formally inaugurated on July 11, 1868, with a trotting race attended by approximately 3,000 spectators. Springville Chief won the first event, which was contested by eight horses over five heats.

=== Grand Circuit racing ===
In 1871, Elisha A. Buck, the park's vice president, participated in discussions with representatives of other racing organizations. He played a key role in establishing a series of trotting meetings that developed into the Quadrilateral Trotting Combination, later known as the Grand Circuit. The Buffalo track held its first meeting under the arrangement from August 5 to 8, 1873. The 1873 meeting offered approximately $70,000 in purses, reportedly the largest total awarded at a harness racing meeting to that date. The park became an established destination for prominent trotting horses, including Goldsmith Maid, Dexter, and Rarus.

In March 1878, C. J. Wells resigned from his position as president of the Buffalo Driving Park Association, and the vacancy was filled by Myron P. Bush. C. J. Hamlin, a Buffalo businessman with extensive horse-breeding interests in nearby East Aurora, later became the association's president.

The construction of the Belt Line Railroad in 1883 improved transportation to the area, allowing visitors and horses to reach the grounds more easily.

=== Later years ===
In 1888, Hamlin transferred the park to a group of investors seeking to establish the International Industrial and Agricultural Exposition. Exhibition halls and other buildings were constructed on the grounds, and the fair opened in September 1888. The venture struggled financially and did not become a permanent attraction.

The Gentleman's Driving Club was organized at the Buffalo Driving Park on September 28, 1892. A. E. Perrine was elected president, Charles P. Brandle secretary, and Henry Smith treasurer. In November 1892, improvements to the park's covered training track were completed under the supervision of superintendent Henry Smith. The enlarged facility provided a three-quarter-mile course for winter training, with accommodations for approximately 150 trotters and pacers.

The Buffalo Driving Park faced closure in August 1895 as restrictions on pool selling threatened the financial sustainability of its racing operations. In January 1896, the Buffalo Driving Park Association announced that it would no longer host Grand Circuit meetings under the restrictions, citing financial losses from its August 1895 meeting.

The Buffalo Driving Park suffered four major fires within a nine month span during 1896, leading to the destruction of its grandstand. Earlier fires had damaged several stables, a hotel, portions of the covered track, and fencing. The repeated incidents were suspected to have been deliberately set.

=== Redevelopment ===
Following the decline of racing at the Buffalo Driving Park, plans were developed to subdivide the 88-acre property into residential lots. In March 1898, engineer George Ricker completed a survey of the grounds, which were assessed at $300,000. The proposed development included 66-foot-wide asphalt streets, water and sewer connections, gas lines, and the planting of shade trees.

The former driving park was sold by C. J. Hamlin's estate to Toronto real estate developer John J. Cook in 1912 for approximately $350,000. Cook intended to subdivide the 80 acres of land for residential development. Although the proposed development was initially called Melrose Lawn, it became known as Hamlin Park Historic District.

== See also ==
- Cicero J. Hamlin
- Hamlin Park Historic District
