= Elisha A. Buck =

American harness racing executive and newspaper publisher (1840–1893)

- Born: 1840; Pomfret, Connecticut, U.S.
- Died: August 30, 1893 (aged 52–53); Queens, New York, U.S.
- Occupations: Harness racing executive, newspaper publisher
- Known for: Co-founding the Grand Circuit; publishing Spirit of the Times
- Awards: U.S. Harness Racing Hall of Fame (2024)

Elisha A. Buck (1840 – August 30, 1893) was an American harness racing executive, horse owner, and newspaper publisher. He was among the organizers of the Grand Circuit, served as vice president of the Buffalo Driving Park, and owned and published the sporting newspaper Spirit of the Times. He was posthumously inducted into the Harness Racing Museum & Hall of Fame in 2024.

== Early life ==
Elisha A. Buck was born in Pomfret, Connecticut, United States, in 1840.

He attended a local district school before finding employment as a clerk in a country store.

== Career ==
Buck left his family home at a young age and eventually began working in railroad construction in Western New York. By the age of 22, he had become a contractor responsible for approximately 500 workers engaged in constructing the Buffalo and Niagara Falls branch of the Erie Railroad. He began his business career under the direction of Dean Richmond, president of the New York Central and Hudson River Railroad. In 1865, Richmond sent him to Green Bay, Wisconsin to take charge of the Western Transportation Company, a steamed freight line on the lakes. He lived in Cleveland and Cincinnati before relocating to Buffalo, New York. He moved there in the early 1870s at the request of Richmond to take charge of another branch of the Central Road's freight business.

In early 1873, he was elected to the board of directors of the Union Steamboat Company, which operated steamship services between Buffalo and major Great Lakes ports in connection with the Erie Railroad. During the early 1880s, Buck sold several steamboats he had operated in the Lake Erie grain trade to William H. Vanderbilt and the New York Central Railroad.

After travelling to Gunnison, Colorado in 1881, he developed an interest in the area's mining industry. He acquired mining stocks in the region and took over the Bullion King Mine along with some businessmen of Easton, Pennsylvania. He also founded the Gunnison News. Although he later sold the newspaper, Buck claimed that it had played a role in making Gunnison County a Democratic stronghold.

Buck served as vice president of the American & Mexican Pacific Railway in 1886, a company organized to develop a railway network connecting Topolobampo Bay on Mexico's Pacific coast with the United States. William Windom served as its president.

=== Harness racing career ===
In 1870, Buck's trotter Harry Harley won a $20,000 stake race, described as the first event of its value in the United States.

He became vice president of the Buffalo Driving Park and was associated with Cicero J. Hamlin.

==== Grand Circuit ====
Buck participated in efforts to establish a coordinated series of trotting meetings among several American racing associations. The proposal emerged in 1871 during discussions involving Colonel William Edwards of Cleveland, L. J. Powers of Springfield, Massachusetts, and John Tod of the Cleveland Driving Club. A meeting at Buck's Buffalo residence in 1873 established the Quadrilateral Trotting Combination, a four-track racing association that later became the Grand Circuit. He oversaw the Buffalo meeting of the inaugural circuit, held at Buffalo Driving Park from August 5 to 8, 1873.

=== Publishing career ===
Buck entered sporting journalism in October 1875 when he acquired a half interest in Spirit of the Times from its publisher, George Wilkes. He assumed editorial and publishing responsibilities before obtaining complete ownership of the newspaper in 1879. Under his direction, the publication expanded its coverage of harness racing and provided information on racing statistics, track administration, and developments in the sport. He remained associated with the newspaper until his death in 1893.

== Death ==
Elisha A. Buck died on August 30, 1893, in Queens, New York, United States. He was killed in a railway collision on the Long Island Railroad. He had been returning from a day of racing at Sheepshead Bay Race Track with his son, Harry, when their train collided with another train near Maspeth, Queens. Buck was killed in the accident, while his son survived despite sustaining serious injuries.

== Legacy ==
Buck was inducted posthumously into the U.S. Harness Racing Hall of Fame as an Immortal on July 7, 2024.
