= Cicero J. Hamlin =

American businessman and harness racing breeder (1819–1905)

- Born: Cicero Julius Hamlin; November 7, 1819; Hillsdale, New York, U.S.
- Died: February 20, 1905 (aged 85); Buffalo, New York, U.S.
- Resting place: Forest Lawn Cemetery
- Occupations: Businessman, horse breeder, harness racing executive
- Known for: Village Farm; Grand Circuit
- Awards: U.S. Harness Racing Hall of Fame (1958)

Cicero J. Hamlin (November 7, 1819 – February 20, 1905) was an American businessman, horse breeder, and harness racing executive who established Village Farm in East Aurora, New York. Hamlin was also involved in the development of the Grand Circuit. He was posthumously inducted into the United Stated Harness Racing Hall of Fame as an Immortal in 1958.

== Early life ==
Cicero Julius Hamlin was born on November 7, 1819, in Hillsdale, New York, United States. He was the youngest of ten children of Reverend Jabez Hamlin and Esther Stow Hamlin. Hamlin's father was a Methodist Minister. His brother was Edward S. Hamlin.

While he was young, Hamlin's family settled in western New York.

== Career ==
=== Business career ===
In 1836, he entered the general merchandise trade in East Aurora, New York, where he established his own store. Hamlin relocated to Buffalo, New York in 1846 and entered the dry goods trade as a partner in Wattles & Hamlin. Following the dissolution of the partnership in 1847, he continued the business independently. He later became associated with Mendsen & Company, a retail enterprise dealing in furniture, carpets, and dry goods. The company became Hamlin & Mendsen in 1860 and opened a new store in 1861, coinciding with the outbreak of the American Civil War at Fort Sumter. The firm expanded into the wholesale market in 1866. Hamlin withdrew from the dry goods trade in 1871.

In 1874, he became president of the Buffalo Grape Sugar Company, which later became part of the American Glucose Company. He also helped finance the Buffalo and Washington Railroad and assumed some of its financial obligations during a period of difficulty.

=== Harness racing career ===
==== Village Farm ====
At the age of 35, Hamlin purchased 66 acres of land in the west end of East Aurora, New York, for $1,200 in May 1855. He began breeding Standardbred horses at his East Aurora property in 1857 with the purchase of Mag Addison. He bred Mag Addison to the noted George M. Patchen, producing a black colt named Hamlin Patchen. The stallion became an important foundation sire at Hamlin's Village Farm. When Hamlin Patchen's daughters became old enough for breeding, he purchased Almont Jr. to serve as their sire. Hamlin later traveled to Kentucky to purchase the stallion Mambrino King for $10,000, a considerable sum at the time. In 1886, he acquired Chimes, a brown stallion sired by Electioneer. He purchased the two-year-old for $12,500 and placed him under the care of Horace Brown, who was then serving as his head trainer.

==== Racing executive ====
In 1868, Hamlin joined other investors in buying the property developed as the Buffalo Driving Park. He became the second president of the driving park association. The facility hosted harness racing meetings. Shortly after, he participated in the organization of the Grand Circuit, a series of major harness racing meetings held at tracks across the United States. He also contributed to the development of racing regulations adopted by the National Trotting Association.

In 1890, at the age of 71, Hamlin drove two trotters of his own breeding, Belle Hamlin and Justina, at Independence, Iowa. Driving a skeleton wagon, he completed the mile in 2:13¼, establishing a world record for a double team.

He later signed Edward Geers to a ten-year contract in 1892, paying him $10,000 annually to serve as the principal driver and head of Village Farm's racing department. Hamlin's trotter The Abbott established a world record of 2:03¼ for the mile in 1900, surpassing the previous mark by half a second.

== Later years and death ==
Hamlin and his superintendent, John Bradburn, revealed plans in October 1904 to discontinue operations at Village Farm within the following months, citing their deteriorating health. Neither of Hamlin's sons intended to carry on the establishment. Village Farm closed in January 1905, ending Hamlin's decades-long involvement in breeding and racing Standardbred horses. The closure of Village Farm led to the sale of approximately 177 horses, which were sent to Madison Square Garden for auction in late January 1905.

Cicerco J. Hamlin died on February 20, 1905, in Buffalo, New York, United States, at the age of 85. He was buried in Forest Lawn Cemetery.

== Legacy ==
Hamlin was credited with establishing the first horse-breeding farm in Erie County, New York. His breeding program produced the county's first trotters to complete a mile in less than 2:25, 2:20, and 2:10, as well as its first trotter to hold a world record.

His contributions were recognized in 1958 when he was inducted into the United Stated Harness Racing Hall of Fame as an Immortal.

The Hamlin Park neighborhood occupies land formerly associated with the Buffalo Driving Park, while Hamlin Avenue in East Aurora runs through part of the former Village Farm property. A plaque honoring C. J. Hamlin was unveiled in Hamlin Park in November 2025.

== Personal life ==
On September 21, 1842, Hamlin married Susan A. Ford in Aurora, New York. They had five children: Anne, William, Frank, Kate, and Harry.
