= Bowles Agawam Airport =

- IATA: none; ICAO: none

Summary
- Operator: Private
- Location: Agawam, Massachusetts, U.S.
- Built: 1927–1930
- In use: May 1930 – 1934; 1944–1981
- Occupants: Private
- Elevation AMSL: 192 ft (59 m)
- Coordinates: 42°3′19.45″N 72°39′21.85″W
- Interactive map of Bowles Agawam Airport

Runways
Direction	Length		Surface
Direction	ft	m	Surface
	1,000	305

Bowles Agawam Airport was an airfield operational in the mid-20th century in Agawam, Massachusetts.

== History ==
In 1927 Robert Hall founded The Springfield Aircraft Co. at the airport. He designed several racing aircraft there that went on to national races.

May 29, 1930, and June 1, 1931, saw "grand openings" of Bowles Agawam Airport with the latter date including a visit from 100 biplanes of the United States Army Air Corps Eastern Air Arm.

A scheduled air service operated out of Bowles for approximately one year, before ending.

The airport also had plans in the early 1960s to become a commercial airport and host airlines for the city of Springfield, but plans were shelved. The airport and racetrack were demolished in the late 1980s and the area is now an industrial park. Airlines now serve Springfield through Bradley International Airport in Windsor Locks, Connecticut.

=== Horse racing track ===
Agawam Park, a pari-mutuel horse racing track, including grandstand and stables, was built adjacent to Bowles Airport. Seabiscuit won the Springfield Handicap at Agawam in track record time in October 1935. The racetrack operated until pari-mutuel betting was outlawed by referendum in Hampden County in November 1938.
