= Agawam Park =

Horse racing track in Agawam, Massachusetts

- Location: Agawam, Massachusetts
- Coordinates: 42°03′11″N 72°39′43″W
- Date opened: 1935
- Date closed: 1938

Agawam Park was an American horse racing track in Agawam, Massachusetts, that was open from 1935 to 1938, when Hampden County, Massachusetts, voted against parimutuel betting.

== Beginnings ==
On May 17, 1935, a special town meeting approved rezoning Bowles Agawam Airport for parimutuel horse racing. On May 28, the Massachusetts Racing Commission granted the Agawam Racers and Breeders Association a racing license. James J. Curry was the track's first president, but business pressures forced him to resign before construction even began. He was succeeded by Thomas Wells Durant. A groundbreaking ceremony was held on July 22, 1935.

== Opening ==
The track opened on October 1, 1935. 15,000 spectators attended the day's races but betting was light. On October 16, Seabiscuit won the $2,500 Springfield Handicap.

== Struggles ==
The track was deeply in debt after its first year and on March 23, 1936, Judge George Clinton Sweeney approved a reorganization of the Agawam Racers and Breeders Association that saw Anderson T. Herd purchase 15,000 shares in the track for $150,000. After Herd took control, James C. Thornton replaced Lou Smith as the track's general manager and Ed Brennan took over as racing secretary.

The track's second meet opened on May 27, 1936. 8,000 people attended the first day of races, which again was plagued by low betting. On August 17, 1936, the track was put up for auction by the Agawam town collector due to unpaid taxes, however, no one bid on the property. On March 29, 1937, Judge Sweeney gave the Agawam Racers and Breeders Association approval to hold races that summer. That August, Paul Bowser sponsored a Grand Circuit meet at Agawam Park.

On November 8, 1938, Hampden County voters rejected a referendum permitting parimutuel betting on horse racing 22,586 votes to 17,487, forcing the closure of Agawam Park.
