= Devonshire Race Track =

Former horse racing venue in Windsor, Ontario

- Location: Windsor, Ontario, Canada
- Operated by: Western Racing Association
- Date opened: 1916
- Race type: Thoroughbred horse racing Harness racing
- Course type: One-mile track

Devonshire Race Track, also known as Devonshire Raceway, was a horse racing venue located in Windsor, Ontario, Canada.

== History ==
=== Establishment and early years ===
Devonshire Race Track was established in 1916 in Windsor, Ontario, Canada. The Western Racing Association leased the property in early 1916. New York sportsman Grant Hugh Brown served as president, Hon. H. O. Reaume was vice-president, and Thomas Duggan was secretary and treasurer. Charley Henschell was general manager of the new establishment. The grounds had a grandstand, a betting ring, and a half-mile track constructed to cater to followers of thoroughbred horse racing. The stables could hold 400 horses.

The association held two seven-day racing meetings in the same year. The first event was scheduled for September 30 to October 7, 1916. The Michigan Central Railroad operated special trains directly to Devonshire Race Track, which could also be reached by ferry to Windsor and trolley service. W. A. Hewitt was an early steward at the race track.

The Western Racing Association faced legal proceedings over allegations of operating a common betting house at Devonshire Race Track in July 1920. In October 1920, management of the track was established with W. R. Woollatt of Windsor elected as president. James Arthur was elected vice president while Norman Grey served as secretary treasurer.

A new grandstand was built in 1922 and seated approximately 10,000.

=== Horse racing ===
In 1923, Devonshire Race Track was selected to host a harness racing meeting in the Grand Circuit. The meeting was organized by the Blue Ribbon Driving Club, an association of former Detroit Driving Club officials and local businessmen. It was run from August 2 to August 8, 1923. The event attracted spectators from the Windsor–Detroit region and prominent drivers, including Ed "Pop" Geers, Tommy Murphy, Nat Ray, and Lon McDonald. The program also revived the Chamber of Commerce pace and M. & M. trot stakes. That year, the famed trotter Peter Manning trotted an exhibition mile in 1:59 1/2 at Devonshire Raceway.

=== Automobile racing ===
Devonshire Race Track also hosted automobile racing meetings sanctioned by the American Automobile Association. On July 14, 1923, the first program consisted of sprint races ranging from five to 25 miles. Among the drivers were Ralph DePalma, Dario Resta, Louis Chevrolet, and Joe Boyer.

=== Golf ===
The grounds included golf links built around 1921 at a cost of $20,000, but they weren't used until years later. In September 1923, the racing association's president William R. Woollatt offered the grounds to Windsor's Civic Recreation Committee to establish a municipal golf course. A committee consisting of Alderman McTavish, Donald McGregor, and Frank W. Bagley was appointed to review the proposal. The nine-hole golf course was opened by the City of Windsor in June 1924.

=== Later use and redevelopment ===
The race track was leased by William Woollatt in June 1931 when an interim receivership was established. The Trusts and Guarantee Company was appointed a receiver pending a suit against the Western Racing Association by C. A. Pfeffer and associates of Detroit. The Western Racing Association, operators of the Devonshire Race Track, declared bankruptcy on January 28, 1932.

Devonshire Race Track became inactive in 1936. On June 15, 1939, a fire destroyed its grandstand, causing an estimated $50,000 in damage. The area known as Devonshire Raceway sat vacant until it was torn down in 1949.

By 1968, the construction of a $15,000,000 shopping centre complex on Howard Avenue was underway on the 100-acre site. The Devonshire Mall officially opened on the former racing grounds in 1970.

== See also ==
- Kenilworth Park Racetrack
- Windsor Raceway
