= Stone Farmhouse =

Historic house in New York, United States

- U.S. National Register of Historic Places
- U.S. Historic district – Contributing property
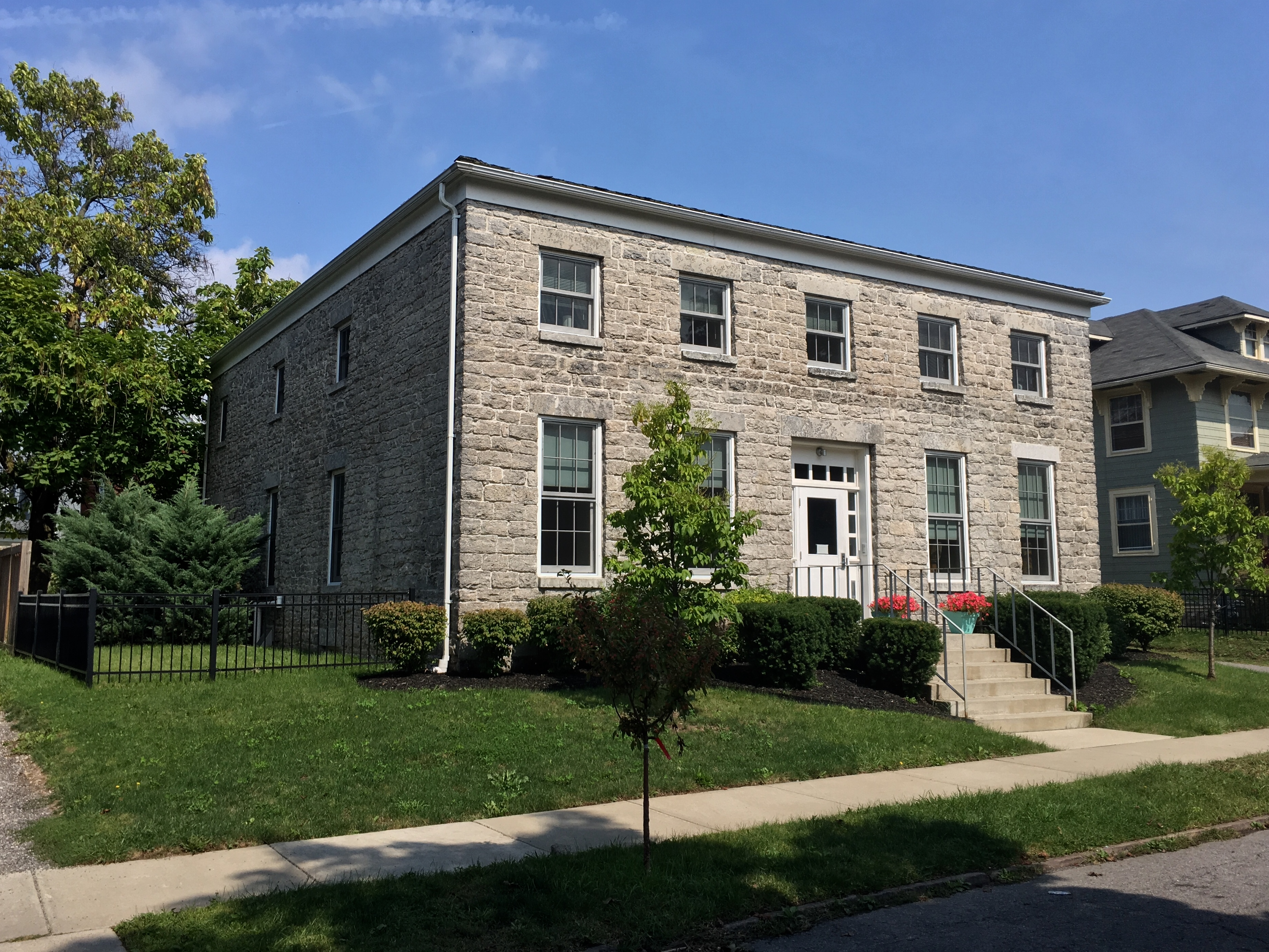
- Stone Farmhouse, Buffalo, NY, September 2019

- Location within New York Location within the United States
- Location: 60 Hedley Pl., Buffalo, New York
- Coordinates: 42°55′24″N 78°51′5″W
- Area: less than one acre
- Built: 1830
- Architectural style: Greek Revival
- NRHP reference No.: 98001614
- Added to NRHP: February 1, 1999

Stone Farmhouse is an historic home located at Buffalo in Erie County, New York. It is a Greek Revival influenced stone vernacular farmhouse. It is a two-story, rectangular hipped roof structure measuring approximately 40 feet wide and 50 feet deep. It was built about 1830–1850 and is one of at least two stone houses in Buffalo surviving from the early 19th century.

Discussion of when the Stone Farmhouse first appears in historical documents. According to the 1854 map "Map of Erie County, New York : from actual surveys" the three structures and associate names occurring east of Main St. and west of what would become Meech St. read from left to right as J.F. "Schantztin", D. "Eragot", and B. "Rumsey"; with J.J. "Baldwin" occurring between what would become the intersecting Meech St. and Oak Grove. This area of the city is not assigned a ward and for the 1840 and 1850 census is called "Black Rock". The 1850 Federal census in Black Rock, page 112, has the neighbor and brewer J.F "Schentztin" but "D. Ergot/Eragot" does not appear, nor do the immediate neighbors of "Rumsey" and Baldwin, however many neighbors at the corner of Delavan and Walden Ave. do. It's possible that this property was originally part of the brewery of J.F."Schentztin". Based on the 1850 census these three properties are not present, though would make up the back yard of the brewery; but by 1854 all three properties are present on the survey map, with the "Rumsey" property in the 1860 census. A study of the deeds is needed.

The 1866 map by Stone & Stewart of the City of Buffalo shows one C.C.Curtiss (Charles. "G." Curtiss B.1827) as owner of 60 Hedley place,1866 Map of the City of Buffalo Charles G. Curtiss is also in the 1865 New York Census, City of Buffalo, ward 12, page 21, as living with his wife Amelia G. Curtiss, four children, Charles's sister Emma and two female servants. The Curtiss house is listed as made of "stone".

According to the 1870 Non-population New York Census on page 1, line 7, Amelia Curtiss is listed as head, with neighbor John Ambrose which concurs with the survey maps. There were 15 acres of improved and 5 acres of woodland. The property, dwelling and all were valued at $18,800; with the farm tools, etc. adding another $100 and $700 in wages were paid. There were 2 horse plus 1 milch cow valued at $400. There were 25 bushels of "Indian corn", 15 bushels of peas and beans, 100 bushels of Irish potatoes, and 30 bushels from an "orchard", and $600 worth of products from a market garden were produced. Plus 100 pounds of butter and 15 (bushels?) of hay. This was not one of the largest nor small farms as compared to the neighbors.

From the "Eleventh and Twelfth Wards" from Buffalo 1872, New York map published by G.M. Hopkins & Co. shows that what would become the St. Vincents Orphanage in the 1880 map is being lived in by the Rail Road Engineer A.M. Curtiss, who later becomes the VP of RR in Buffalo, NY. The dash lines show where Jefferson St. will be constructed through one of the buildings.

The 1880 map of the City of Buffalo by F.W. Beers & Co. shows that the J.F. "Schantstin" building is between Main St. and Jefferson. To the east of Jefferson, of what was the "Ergot"-Curtiss house became the St. Vincent Female Orphanage and is set back from Delavan Ave. at roughly where 60 Hedley place is today. The B.C. "Rumsey" (Bronson C. Rumsey) is east of Meech St. and west of Oak Grove.1880 Map with buildings mark above Delavan Ave.

The Hedley Stone Farmhouse was likely set back from Delavan Ave. originally as the 1891 map by Rand, McNally & Company shows the eastern half of Hedley St. with a connection to Oak Grove (street) as having been constructed by the time of making the map. The Western half of Hedley St. connecting to Jefferson Ave. had not been constructed yet.Rand, McNally & Company 1891 map This area o the city is ward 12 from 1855 to 1890. Ward Map. It is part of ward 25 in 1893. Ward Map 1893

Although neighborhood legend holds that it was used as slave quarters, all evidence indicates that it was built well after New York State abolished slavery in 1827.

The stone farmhouse was listed on the National Register of Historic Places in 1999. It is located in the Hamlin Park Historic District.
