= Grand Circuit =

Group of harness racing stakes races

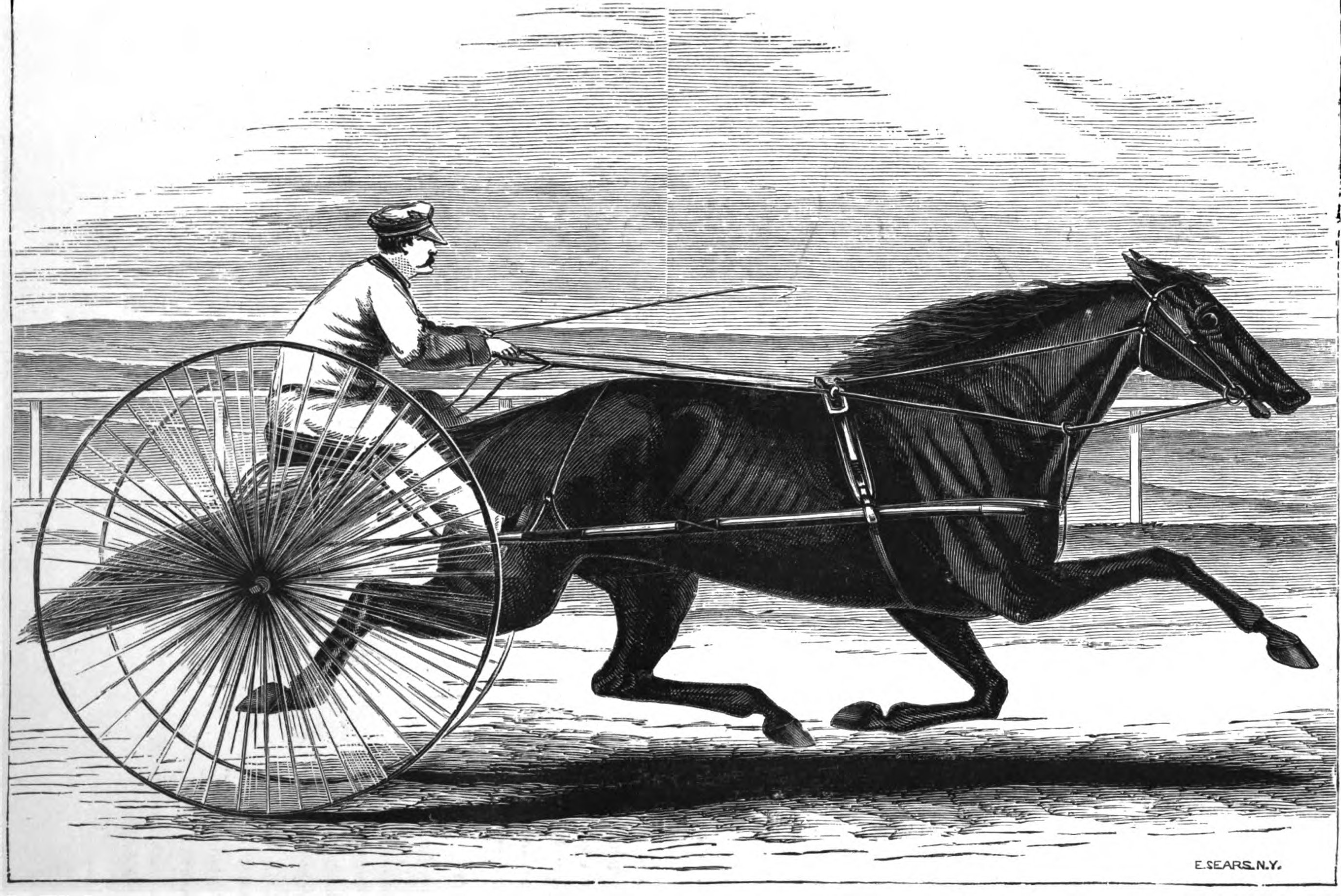
Goldsmith Maid, perennial fan favorite trotter

The Grand Circuit, also known as the "Big Wheel", is a group of harness racing stakes races run at various race tracks around the United States. Run on one-mile tracks, it is "the oldest continuing horse-racing series in the United States."

The series was started in 1871 by Colonel Billy Edwards, of Cleveland, Ohio, L.J. Powers of Springfield, Massachusetts, Elisha A. Buck of Buffalo, New York, and later C.W. Hutchinson of Utica, New York. The first meeting of the Circuit was held in 1873 in Cleveland, followed by races in Springfield, Buffalo, and Utica. The original four-location competition was named "The Quadrilateral Trotting Combination," but was renamed when additional legs were added.

In 1914 the Grand Circuit consisted of six tracks, located in: Cleveland, Ohio; Columbus, Ohio; The Red Mile in Lexington, Kentucky; Detroit, Michigan; Grand Rapids, Michigan; and Kalamazoo, Michigan. Prior to this there were more, including Narragansett Park in Providence, Rhode Island; Charter Oak Park in Hartford, Connecticut; Readville Race Track in Boston, Massachusetts; Rockingham Park in Salem, New Hampshire; Fleetwood Park Racetrack in New York, New York; and Poughkeepsie, New York, but anti-gambling laws during the early part of the 20th century caused them to drop out.

As of 2023, the circuit was run at 22 tracks.

== Tracks as of 2023 ==
As listed by the United States Trotting Association, in 2023 the Grand Circuit Races were held at the following 22 venues:

- Charlottetown Driving Park
- Delaware County Fairgrounds racetrack (1940–present)
- Dover Downs
- Freehold Raceway
- Goshen Historic Track (1911, 1927–1942, 1946–present)
- Harrah's Philadelphia
- Hoosier Park
- Dayton Raceway (1989–present)
- Indiana State Fairgrounds (1926–1941, 1946–present)
- Meadowlands Racetrack (1977–present)
- The Meadows (1966–present)
- Woodbine Mohawk Park (1978–present)
- Pocono Downs
- Northfield Park
- Plainridge Racecourse
- The Red Mile (1904, 1912–present)
- Saratoga Race Course (1942–present)
- Scioto Downs
- Tioga Downs (2006–present)
- Vernon Downs (1954–present)
- Western Fair Raceway
- Yonkers Raceway (1899–1890, 1903–1905, 1910, 1913, 1951–present)

== Former tracks ==
- Cleveland Driving Park (1871–1904)
- Buffalo Driving Park (1871–1878, 1880–1884, 1886–1894, 1898–1902)
- Hampden Park (1871–1877, 1880–1881, 1883–1893)
- Utica Driving Park (1871–1879, 1881–1884, 1886–1888)
- Rochester Driving Park (1875–1895)
- Poughkeepsie Driving Park (1875–1877, 1882, 1889–1890, 1894, 1906–1909, 1916, 1918–1922)
- Homewood Park (1881–1882, 1884, 1890–1893)
- Narragansett Park (1883–1885, 1899–1905, 1907)
- Charter Oak Park (1876–1892, 1894, 1897–1925, 1929–1932)
- Island Park (1884–1889)
- Detroit Driving Club (1886)
- Fleetwood Park Racetrack (1888–1890, 1893–1897)
- Point Breeze Park (1890–1894)
- Hamtramck Park (1893)
- Union Park (1894–1896)
- Grosse Pointe Track (1894–1917)
- Columbus Driving Park (1896–1925)
- Indiana State Fairgrounds (1896, 1911)
- Fort Wayne Driving Park (1896–1898)
- Glens Falls Mile Track (1897–1901)
- Readville Race Track (1897–1908, 1910–1912, 1918–1925)
- Rigby Park (1898)
- Vigo County Fairgrounds (1900–1902)
- New York State Fairgrounds Racetrack (1901–1930, 1933–1941)
- Chester Park (1901–1906)
- Brighton Beach Race Course (1902–1904)
- Kenilworth Park Race Track (1903–1908)
- North Memphis Driving Park (1904–1905)
- Elkwood Park (1908–1909)
- Kalamazoo Recreation Park/Exposition Park (1908–1931)
- Fort Erie Race Track (1909–1914, 1932–1934)
- Forest City Fairgrounds (1909–1939, 1945)
- Comstock Park (1911–1915, 1927, 1929–1930)
- Pittsburgh Driving Club (1912–1914, 1916)
- Rockingham Park (1912–1913, 1932–1934)
- Michigan State Fairgrounds Speedway (1912–1914, 1927, 1929)
- Windsor Fair Grounds (1913)
- Montreal Exposition Grounds (1915)
- Piedmont Driving Club (1916–1922, 1925–1928)
- Belmont Driving Park (1917–1922)
- Maumee Downs (1918–1930, 1932–1941, 1947–1951)
- Devonshire Raceway (1923–1924)
- Aurora Downs (1925, 1929–1930, 1947–1950)
- Ideal Park (1926)
- Monroe Driving Park (1926)
- Orange County Fair Speedway (1926)
- Coney Island Race Track (1929)
- Thorncliffe Park Raceway (1931)
- London Fairgrounds (1931)
- Illinois State Fairgrounds Racetrack (1931–1941, 1946–2015)
- Good Time Park (1935–1956)
- Ohio State Fairgrounds (1936–1937)
- Milwaukee Fairgrounds (1936, 1941–1948)
- Kite Track (1936–1939, 1942–1946, 1949)
- Reading Fairgrounds (1937–1943, 1946–1955)
- Agawam Park (1937–1938)
- Mineola Race Track (1940)
- Narragansett Park (1940)
- Kentucky State Fairgrounds (1940–1941)
- Roosevelt Raceway (1941–1987)
- Buffalo Raceway (1941, 1966–????)
- New Jersey State Fairgrounds (1944–1945)
- DuQuoin State Fairgrounds Racetrack (1944–2009)
- Santa Anita Park (1946, 1948, 1950, 1952)
- Maywood Park (1947–1950)
- Hollywood Park (1947, 1949, 1951, 1953–????)
- Fairmount Park Racetrack (1949–1950)
- Missouri State Fair Speedway (1949–????)
- Wolverine Raceway (1951–????)
- Hazel Park Raceway (1954–????)
- Bay State Raceway (1956–????)
- Sportsman's Park (1956–1997)
- Arden Downs (1957–1962)
- Suffolk Downs (1960)
- Rosecroft Raceway (1961–????)
- Baltimore Raceway (1961–????)
- Monticello Raceway (1961–????)
- Grandview Raceway (1961–????)
- Liberty Bell Park (1963–1983)
- Phoenix Trotting Park (1966)
- Pompano Park (1966–2021)
- Atlantic City Race Course
- Brandywine Raceway (1971–1985)
- Garden State Park Racetrack
- Los Alamitos Race Course
- Freestate Raceway
- Batavia Downs
- Hippodrome de Trois-Rivières
- Miami Valley Gaming

== See also ==
- Harness racing § Important races
