= Hamlin Park Historic District =

Historic district in New York, United States

- U.S. National Register of Historic Places
- U.S. Historic district
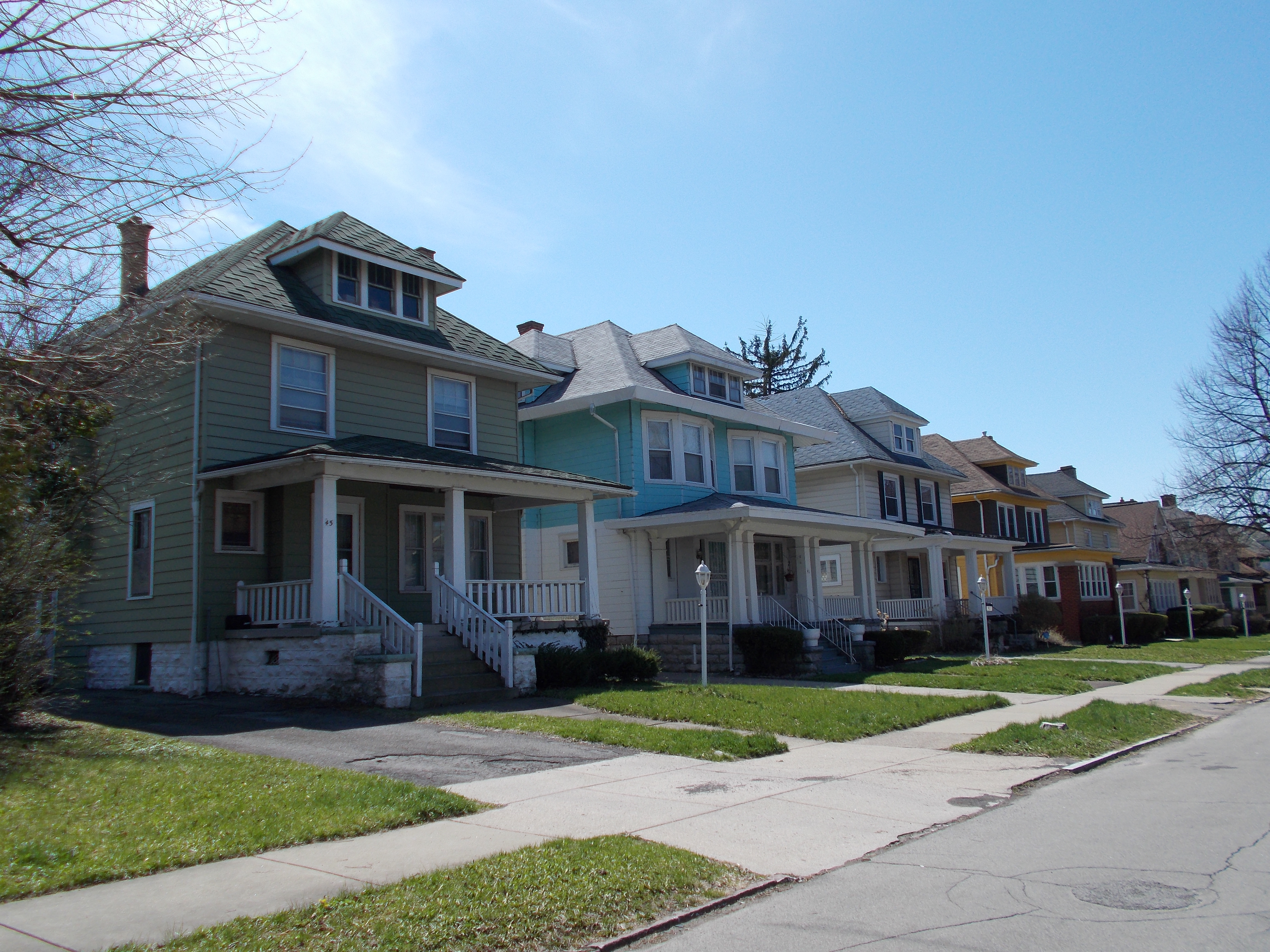
- Blaine Avenue, Hamlin Park Historic District, April 2013

- Location within New York Location within the United States
- Location: Beverly, Donaldson, Hamlin, & Lonsdale Rds., Blaine, Butler, E. Delevan, Goulding, Hughes, Jefferson & Loring Aves., Buffalo, New York
- Coordinates: 42°55′13″N 78°50′53″W
- Area: 224.28 acres (90.76 ha)
- Built: c. 1895-1975
- Architectural style: pattern book, Bungalow/craftsman
- NRHP reference No.: 13000462
- Added to NRHP: July 3, 2013

Hamlin Park Historic District is a national historic district and neighborhood located at Buffalo in Erie County, New York. The district encompasses 1,368 contributing buildings, 3 contributing sites, and 6 contributing structures in a predominantly residential section of Buffalo. The district includes a variety of residential buildings built primarily between about 1895 and 1930, and later improved through Model Cities Program grants between 1966 and 1975. It includes a variety of pattern book houses in popular architectural styles of the late-19th and early-20th century, with some interspersed Bungalow / American Craftsman style dwellings. Located in the district are the separately listed Robert T. Coles House and Studio and Stone Farmhouse. Other notable buildings include the Lutheran Church Home (1906), the former Second United Presbyterian Church (1920), and the former St. Francis DeSales Roman Catholic Church (1926).

It was listed on the National Register of Historic Places in 2013.
