= Horseman Futurity =

American harness race for 3-year-old trotters and pacers

- Location: Indianapolis, Indiana, U.S. (inaugural)
- Inaugurated: 1907
- Race type: Harness race for standardbred trotters and pacers

Race information
- Distance: 1 mile (1,609 metres or 8 furlongs)
- Surface: Dirt
- Track: Indiana State Fairgrounds (inaugural)
- Qualification: 3-year-olds

The Horseman Futurity is an American harness racing event for three-year-old Standardbred trotters and pacers. First contested in 1907, the Horseman Futurity became an established part of the annual harness racing program at the Indiana State Fair in Indianapolis.

== History ==
The first running of the Horseman Futurity took place in September 1907 under the auspices of the Western Horseman, an Indianapolis-based racing publication that later became the Horseman and Fair World. The Horseman Futurity became the feature event of the Grand Circuit meeting held in connection with the annual Indiana State Fair in Indianapolis, Indiana. The futurity was originally divided into separate trotting and pacing divisions, each restricted to three-year-old harness racing horses competing under prescribed rules and conditions. The first winner of the trotting division was Kentucky Todd who was piloted by Harry C. Stinson. Betty Brent driven by Vance Nuckols was the first winner of the pacing division.

Following the inaugural race at the Indiana State Fair, it was run in 1909, 1911, 1913, and annually thereafter until 1917. It was held in Columbus, Ohio from 1918 to 1921 and Syracuse, New York from 1922 to 1924 before returning to Indianapolis in 1925. The Western Horseman events including the Horseman Futurity were held in Syracuse in 1933. After two years in Syracuse, the race returned to Indianapolis. The Indiana State Fair Board announced that the 1935 state fair racing program would feature four new stakes: three divisions of the Horseman Futurity and the Frank P. Fox Stake for two-year-old pacers. The Horseman Futurity was later moved to northeastern New York after the Indiana State Fairgrounds were taken over for military purposes during World War II. Due to the closing of the state fairground at Indianapolis in 1942, the stakes were raced at Saratoga, New York. The Horseman Futurity was featured on the 1943 program of the annual Darke County Fair in Greenville, Ohio. The stake events, sponsored by the Horseman and Fair World, made a return to the Grand Circuit racing program at the Indiana State Fair in 1946. At the end of 1954, the Indiana State Fair Board purchased the Horseman Futurities and other stakes from the non-profit organization headed by Robert I. Terry, the son of the late Fred Terry. The Horseman Futurity was temporarily relocated to Washington Park in Homewood, Illinois, in 1962 after it was postponed by rain.

== Modern event ==
The Horseman Futurity is owned and sponsored by the Indiana State Fair and administered by the Hambletonian Society. In its current format, the Horseman Futurity is contested in a single heat or in divisions. The State Fair-owned stakes consist of the 3-Year-Old Open Trot, 3-Year-Old Filly Trot, 3-Year-Old Open Pace, and 3-Year-Old Filly Pace.

== Locations ==
- 1907–1917: Indiana State Fairgrounds Speedway, Indianapolis, Indiana, U.S.
- 1918–1921: Ohio State Fairgrounds, Columbus, Ohio, U.S.
- 1922–1925: Syracuse Mile, Syracuse, New York, U.S.
- 1926–1932: Indiana State Fairgrounds Speedway, Indianapolis, Indiana, U.S.
- 1933–1934: Syracuse Mile, Syracuse, New York, U.S.
- 1935–1941: Indiana State Fairgrounds Speedway, Indianapolis, Indiana, U.S.
- 1942: Saratoga Raceway, Saratoga, New York, U.S.
- 1943–1945: Darke County Fairgrounds, Greenville, Ohio, U.S.
- 1946–1961: Indiana State Fairgrounds Speedway, Indianapolis, Indiana, U.S.
- 1962: Washington Park Race Track, Chicago, Illinois, U.S.
- 1963–present: Indiana State Fairgrounds Speedway, Indianapolis, Indiana, U.S.

== Horseman Futurity winners ==
Horseman Futurity – Three-Year-Old Trot
Year	Winner	Driver	Fastest heat	Purse
1907	Kentucky Todd	Harry C. Stinson	2:09	$4,000.00
1909	Baroness Virginia	Sam'l J. Fleming	2:13 1/4	$4,000.00
1911	Mainleaf	Richard Curtis	2:09 1/4	$6,500.00
1913	Etawah	Edward F. Geers	2:10 1/4	$6,277.50
1914	Ortolan Axworthy	Alonzo McDonald	2:08 1/4	$6,625.00
1915	Native Spirit	Bert O. Shank	2:08 1/4	$6,552.68
1916	Bingen Silk	J. B. Chandler	2:07 1/4	$4,900.82
1917	Harvest Gale	Walter R. Cox	2:08 3/4	$3,598.57
1918	Peter June	Edward F. Geers	2:05 1/2	$4,188.13
1919	Periscope	John L. Dodge	2:06 1/4	$4,839.04
1920	Arion Guy	Harry H. Stokes	2:05 1/4	$6,406.97
1921	Nelson Dillon	Joseph L. Serrill	2:05 1/2	$5,500.00
1922	Peter Earl	Nat Ray	2:05 1/4	$5,242.15
1923	The Senator	Alonzo McDonald	2:07 1/2	$4,902.14
1924	Mr. McElwyn	Ben F. White	2:03 3/4	$4,379.62
1925	Sam Williams	Walter R. Cox	2:06 1/4	$4,394.25
1926	Charm	Ben F. White	2:08 1/4	$5,933.83
1927	Iosola's Worthy	Thomas S. Berry	2:05 3/4	$7,665.43
1928	Etta Volo	William K. Dickerson	2:04 1/2	$7,712.10
1929	Volomite	Walter R. Cox	2:04 1/2	$8,468.04
1930	Legality	Hugh M. Parshall	2:06 1/2	$7,454.25
1931	Protector	Will Caton	2:02 1/4	$6,428.98
1932	The Marchioness	Will Caton	2:02	$6,105.00
1933	Brown Berry	Fred Egan	2:03 3/4	$6,805.75
1934	Vitamine	Will Caton	2:01 3/4	$4,293.07
1935	Greyhound	Sep F. Palin	2:05	$3,088.95
1936	Bill Strang	William K. Dickerson	2:02 3/4	$3,235.65
1937	Southland	Fred Egan	2:03 1/2	$3,141.17
1938	McLin	Henry Thomas	2:01 3/4	$5,155.50
1939	Lyrmite	Thomas S. Berry	2:07	$3,160.92
1940	Spencer Scott	Fred Egan	2:01 1/4	$4,480.97
1941	Bill Gallon	Lee Smith	2:01	$4,792.97
1942	Pay Up	Lee Smith	2:07 1/4 hmt	$5,979.90
1943	Darnley	Harry Whitney	2:04 3/4 hmt	$7,084.68
1944	Yankee Maid	Henry Thomas	2:05 1/4 hmt	$4,290.86
1945	Voltitle	Sep F. Palin	2:05 1/4 hmt	$3,755.00
1946	Victory Song	Sep F. Palin	2:01 3/4	$5,475.35
1947	Way Yonder	Del Cameron	2:03 3/5	$6,465.72
1948	Egan Hanover	Ralph Baldwin	2:02 3/5	$12,130.12
1949	Bangaway	Ralph Baldwin	2:05	$15,493.26
1950	Lusty Song	Delvin Miller	2:02	$12,803.99

Horseman Futurity – Three-Year-Old Pacers
Year	Winner	Driver	Fastest heat	Purse
1907	Betty Brent	Vance Nuckols	2:12 1/2	$2,100.00
1909	Maggie Winder	Henry M. Jones	2:06 1/2	$2,000.00
1911	Miss De Forest	Alonzo McDonald	2:07 3/4	$3,366.64
1913	Homer Baughman	Crit Davis	2:12 1/4	$3,381.19
1914	Bud Elliott	Frank G. Jones	2:14 1/4	$3,567.30
1915	Gen. Todd	Guy Rea	2:04 1/4	$3,528.38
1916	Allis Jolla	C. A. Valentine	2:17 1/4	$2,670.13
1917	Rex De Forest	Walter R. Cox	2:11 1/2	$1,983.84
1918	Liberty Mac	Wm. A. Hasch	2:09 1/4	$2,370.53
1919	Goldie King	Thomas W. Murphy	2:10 3/4	$2,598.04
1920	Tramp Safe	Harry A. Stokes	2:04 1/2	$2,362.98
1921	Peter Henley	Thomas W. Murphy	2:08 1/4	$2,000.00
1922	Peter Etawah	Thomas W. Murphy	2:06 3/4	$2,056.73
1923	Anna Bradford's Girl	Ben F. White	2:05 3/4	$1,859.61
1924	Marion C.	Walter T. Candler	2:11 1/2	$1,791.33
1925	Hollywood Abigail	John L. Dodge	2:12 1/2	$1,876.68
1926	Highland Scott	Thomas W. Murphy	2:06 1/2	$2,358.60
1927	Hollywood Jacqueline	Harry Stokes	2:03 3/4	$4,127.54
1928	Trampunion	Marvin Childs	2:07 1/4	$3,448.86
1929	Petroguy	Sep F. Palin	2:06 1/4	$3,719.32
1930	Calumet Adam	R. D. McMahon	2:07 1/2	$3,606.14
1931	Calumet Brownie	Fred Egan	2:02	$3,134.84
1932	Raider	Fred Egan	2:03	$3,338.45
1933	Daniel Hanover	Thomas S. Berry	2:03	$2,449.25
1934	Calumet Evelyn	Vic Fleming	2:07 3/4	$1,875.11
1935	Calumet Fingo	Ray Nohlechek	2:09 1/2	$1,749.90
1936	Jack Orr	William K. Dickerson	2:02	$1,469.20
1937	Frisco Dale	Homer Walton	2:04 3/4	$1,689.48
1938	Chief Counsel	Hugh M. Parshall	2:01 3/4	$1,839.50
1939	Alban	Harry Whitney	2:07 1/4	$1,327.03
1940	William Cash	W. Britenfield	2:01 1/4	$2,385.90
1941	Wilmington	Harry Fitzpatrick	2:04 1/4	$2,151.99
1942	Margamite	John F. Simpson	2:08 hmt	$2,591.00
1943	King's Counsel	Hugh M. Parshall	2:09 1/2 hmt	$3,043.67
1944	Filly Direct	T. Wayne Smart	2:08 3/4 hmt	$2,350.85
1945	Jimmy Creed	Claude Wright	2:09 1/2 hmt	$1,829.57
1946	Honest Truth	McKinley Kirk	2:05 3/4	$4,025.34
1947	Norris Hanover	Henry Myott	2:02 4/5	$5,265.73
1948	Knight Dream	Franklin Safford	2:01 3/5	$9,730.14
1949	Stormyway	Ralph Baldwin	2:02 4/5	$11,593.27
1950	Quilla Hanover	John F. Simpson	2:00 4/5	$14,604.00
