= Alonzo McDonald (harness racing) =

American harness racing driver (1862–1930)

Lon McDonald
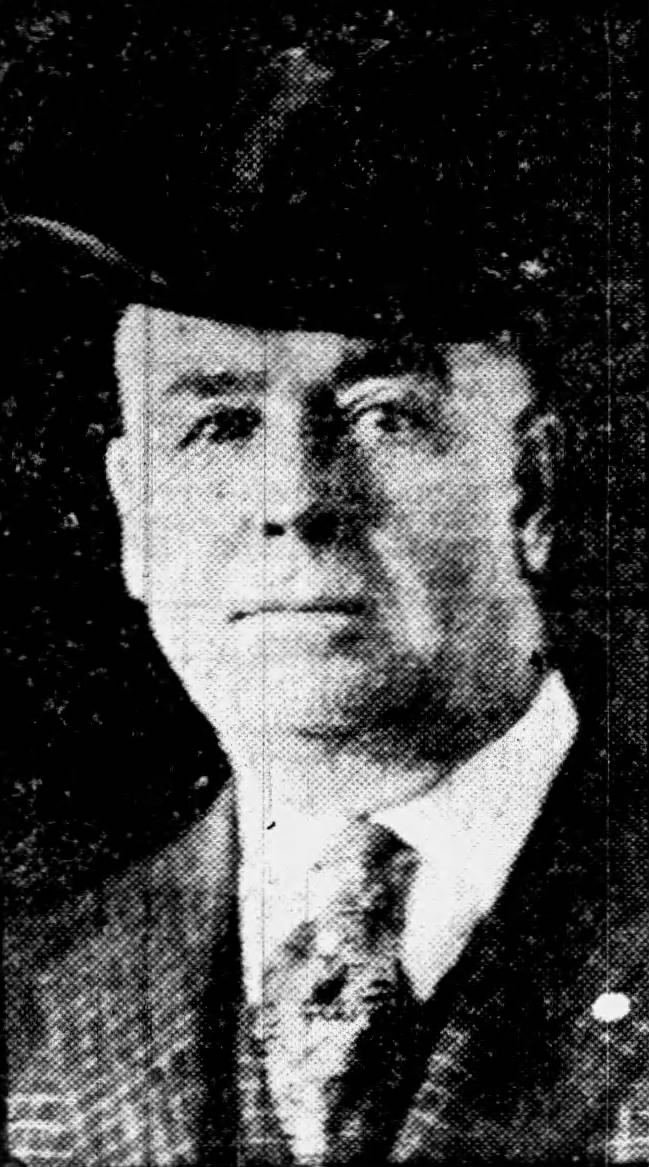

Personal information
- Nickname: Lon McDonald
- Born: Alonzo McDonald; 1862 Malone, New York, U.S.
- Died: July 26, 1930 (aged 67–68) Cleveland, Ohio, U.S.
- Occupations: Harness racing driver; horse trainer

Horse racing career
- Sport: Harness racing

Major racing wins
- Kentucky Futurity (1903, 1905); American Trotting Derby (1908); Walnut Hall Cup (1917, 1919, 1921); Championship Stallion Stake Pace (1911, 1915, 1918); Championship Stallion Stake Trot (1923); Horseman Futurity Trot (1914, 1923); Horseman Futurity Pace (1911); Western Horseman Stake (1914); Review Futurity Trot (1923); Review Futurity Pace (1911, 1926); Matron Stake Pace (1911); Arthur S. Tompkins Memorial (1927)

Honors
- United States Harness Racing Hall of Fame (1958)

Alonzo 'Lon' McDonald (1862 – June 26, 1930) was an American harness racing driver and horse trainer.

== Early life and education ==
Alonzo McDonald was born in Malone, New York, United States, in 1862.

== Career ==
McDonald began working with horses as a horse groom for Orrin Partridge. Partridge, his uncle, resided in St. Lawrence County. While working under Partridge, a leading trainer and driver in Northern New York, McDonald learned the fundamentals of horse training and trained horses on a track at Brasher Falls, New York. By 1883, he was campaigning horses independently, driving Malone Patchen on the half-mile tracks at Malone, New York. His work drew the attention of horse owners, and led to his rise in the profession.

He was employed at Cicero J. Hamlin's Village Farm in East Aurora, New York from 1891 until his departure in 1895. At Village Farm, McDonald handled colt training under Ed Geers, handing those off with Grand Circuit potential to him. He was soon sent out with a second stable, where he won consistently and produced top trotters that elevated the Hamlin establishment.

After his apprenticeship, he returned to Malone, New York and formed his own public stable. He spent the 1896 season competing across the Vermont and northern New York circuift, including at Plattsburg. The New Yorker relocated his string of trotting horses to Boston, Massachusetts at Mystic Park in May 1897. For a number of years, his base of operations was the Readville Race Track. McDonald had one of his most successful seasons in 1899, campaigning a seven-horse stable. His stable included Joe Gahm, Harry Shedd, Dombey Jr., Dodge, Dewey, Doctor L., and Alberta. He recorded 38 wins during the 1899 season.

He was among the first to see the potential in Peter the Great as a sire. He was drawn to a filly from the stallion's early foals, bred at J. Malcolm Forbes' farm in Milton, Massachusetts, and asked to name her Sadie Mac after his daughter. Along with D. H. Sherman, he purchased Sadie Mac as a yearling from J. M. Johnson for $4,000. He never raced her at age two, though she showed strong speed in trial work. As a three-year-old under McDonald's guidance, she remained unbeaten in races, losing only a single heat before her sale. He sold her in 1903 to E. E. Smathers for $20,000. He continued to train and drive Sadie Mac, who went undefeated during her three-year-old campaign. He drove her to a victory in the 1903 Kentucky Futurity. She continued her success with McDonald in 1904 until her sudden death at the Charter Oak track in Hartford, Connecticut in 1905.

He captured his second Kentucky Futurity in 1906 with Miss Adbell.

McDonald was the leading money-winning driver in 1908. His campaign included all 10 Grand Circuit meetings and Lexington, in addition to Peoria, Terre Haute, and Kalamazoo on the Great Western Circuit. That year, McDonald took over the training of the five-year-old Allen Winter and quickly developed him into a leading racehorse. He guided Allen Winter, owned by M. H. Reardon, to win the first-ever $50,000 American Trotting Derby at Readville, Boston on August 25, 1908. The win brought him the biggest purse in Grand Circuit history at the time. Boston artist Wilbur Duntley painted the scene titled, "A Race for a Fortune."

He left Boston for Indianapolis in order to base himself at the center of the Grand Circuit. At the time, his assistant trainer was Ed Avery.

He drove Miss De Forest to victory in the Horseman Futurity, Matron Stake, and Review Futurity for three-year-old pacers in 1911. In 1912, he had bought Star Winter for $15,000 on behalf of William G. Snell of New Bedford, then the second-highest price ever paid for a gelding. He was entrusted with the gelding's training for the Grand Circuit. By 1913, his Indianapolis stable also included Tom Horn, Billy Buff, Sox DeForest, Allerworthy, Lord Allen, Airdale, and Sarah Douglas. He went on to guide Lord Allen, a bay colt owned by J. Howard Ford, to win the Kentucky Futurity's junior division in 1912. He also campaigned Billy Burk for Ford for two seasons, developing him into a champion before he was sold to European interests for $50,000 in late 1912.

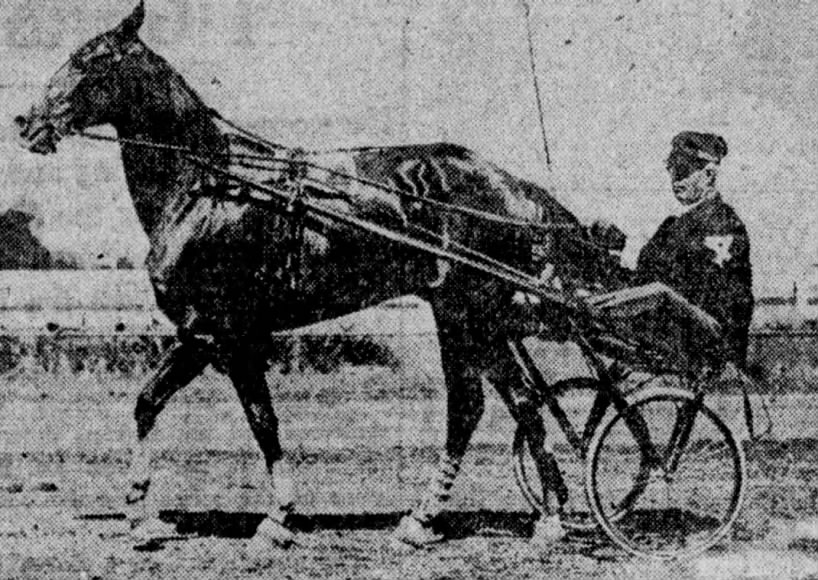
Lon Mcdonald with McCloskey, c. 1915

In the spring of 1914, John L. Snyder sent him Ortolan Axworthy, whose sire was Axworthy. He guided the colt to capture the Western Horseman Stake at the Indiana State Fair. In addition, he won the 1914 Horseman Futurity for three-year-old trotters with Ortolan Axworthy. He raced Miss Harris M. as a two-year-old in 1914 and later drove her to a two-minute mile, making her the first pacing mare in the history of harness racing to secure a record of 2:00 or better. He later handled The Senator throughout his two-year-old campaign in 1922. With The Senator, he secured the 1923 Horseman Futurity Three-Year-Trot, his second win in the event, along with the Review Futurity.

He took on the training of the trotter Spencer, winning the Arthur S. Tompkins Memorial in 1927. He suffered serious injuries in 1928 at Cleveland, Ohio, while driving Spencer in the championship stake, along with two other prominent drivers, and he was less active in the sulky afterward.

The last horse he trained and drove was the bay colt, Calumet Bush, before his death in 1930. The Grand Circuit driver had a 45 year career.

== Death ==
Alonzo McDonald died on July 26, 1930 in Cleveland, Ohio, United States. Following a heart attack on the way to the North Randall Race Track, he was rushed to the St. Luke's Hospital by Thomas S. Berry, where he passed away several hours later.

== Legacy ==
He was noted among the Grand Circuit's Big Four, with Ed Geers, Thomas Murphy, and Walter R. Cox.

In 1958, he was elected into the U.S. Harness Racing Hall of Fame.
