= Fred Egan =

American harness racing driver (1879–1960)

Personal information
- Born: Fred F. Egan; October 3, 1879 Stuart, Iowa, U.S.
- Died: January 9, 1960 (aged 80) Orlando, Florida, U.S.
- Occupations: Harness racing driver; horse trainer
- Years active: 1908-1958

Horse racing career
- Sport: Harness racing

Major racing wins
- Matron Stake Pace (1932); Matron Stake Trot (1934, 1940); Horseman Futurity (1933, 1937, 1940); Kentucky Futurity (1934, 1940); Hambletonian Stakes (1940, 1949, 1958); Championship Stallion Stake (1940); Walnut Hall Cup (1943); Horseman Stake (1941, 1946, 1948)

Honors
- United States Harness Racing Hall of Fame (1960)

Significant horses
- Spencer Scott; Emily's Pride

Fred Egan (October 3, 1879 – January 9, 1960) was an American harness racing driver and horse trainer who won the Hambletonian Stakes three times and was inducted into the United States Harness Racing Hall of Fame in 1960.

== Early life and education ==
Fred Egan was born on October 3, 1879, in Stuart, Iowa, United States.

His father was Pat Agen, but his last name was misspelled as "Egan" on his Civil war papers, becoming the family name. He trained and raced horses on the Iowa State racing circuit.

== Career ==
As a youth in Des Moines, Iowa, Egan worked as a newsboy before later becoming a bellhop at a local hotel. He eventually joined his father at the Iowa State Fairgrounds track, where he gained his early experience with racehorses as a groom. Dissatisfied with the routine of stable work, he briefly returned to his hotel position. His father later convinced him to rejoin the stable and assist in preparing horses for races at county fairs throughout Iowa.

Egan left Iowa in 1904 after "Dad" Whitney of Des Moines hired him as a groom for the pacing mare Lady Knapp. The campaign took him to race meetings in Johnstown, Pennsylvania, and Cleveland, Ohio. After Whitney's racing operation came to an end, he continued with other horses.

Following his family's move to Denver, Colorado, he started handling and training horses for Joe McGuire. In the summer of 1909, he was engaged by western owner M. E. Lee in Winnipeg to train the pacer Donax. He drove Donax to the first sub-2:10 mile of his career.

=== Public Stable ===
Egan open a public stable in Denver. He added the three-year-old pacer Braden Direct to his stable in 1911. His campaign with Braden Direct marked his first season competing on the Grand Circuit. Under his guidance, the colt went undefeated at age three, highlighted by a win in the Kentucky Futurity. In October 1913, the young reinsman was engaged by George H. Estabrook to train the remainder of his string including world's champion three-year-old Colorado E.

Egan planned to establish his stable in Omaha, Nebraska, but the plan was canceled after he could not secure stalls at the Ak-Sar-Ben track. He instead shipped his stable of 16 horses to Memphis, Tennessee, in November 1919. He joined Ed Geers and Fred Edman in wintering horses at North Memphis Driving Park.

He developed Voltage into a successful racehorse, campaigning the colt in 1919 and guiding him to victory in the $2,000 Lexington Stake.

=== Lullwater Farm ===
His public stable continued until he was appointed trainer of the Lullwater Farm harness horses belonging to Walter T. Candler of Atlanta, Georgia. He was engaged by Candler to be head trainer and driver in late October 1925. When the first-ever Hambletonian Stakes was held in 1926, Egan competed with the bay colt Bronx, who finished outside the money. At the second Hambletonian, he drove Egan, a colt named for his father, to a money finish. He entered two contenders in the 1930 Hambletonian, with both Belricka and Keno finishing in the money. He raced for the Candler stable until the fall of 1930. After working with Candler, he returned to his public stable.

=== Public Stable ===
The Iowa-born trainer established a winter training base in Longwood, Florida. He began to train horses for Thomas J. McKinney of Buffalo. The two had become acquainted at a Grand Circuit meeting in Cleveland around 1930, after which McKinney entrusted him with purchasing horses on his behalf. Among his selections for McKinney were Raider, whom he developed into the 1932 Grand Circuit pacing champion, and a colt by Peter Volo. He purchased the filly Princess Peg in 1932 on behalf of McKinney, and she emerged as a contender for the Hambletonian. According to a 1933 newspaper report, the retired oil magnate's will left Egan a bequest of $25,000 and a life annuity of $125 per month.

During the summer of 1933, Egan campaigned Brown Berry for the Lytle Brothers, driving the colt to a second-place finish in the Matron Stake and a third-place finish in the Championship Stallion Stake. He also guided Brown Berry to victory in the inaugural American Stake No. 1 at Rockingham Park against a field of 11 other Hambletonian candidates. At the 1933 Hambletonian, Egan was leading the deciding heat with Brown Berry until the colt broke stride and was overtaken by Mary Reynolds, driven by Ben White. The following year, he trained both Princess Peg and Emily Stokes for the 1934 Hambletonian but left the driving assignments to others.

Egan also campaigned horses owned by Charles W. Phellis of Greenwich, Connecticut. Under C. W. Phellis, he trained the homebred Spencer Scott who captured the 1940 Hambletonian at Good Time Park. It was Egan's first Hambletonian victory, coming at the age of 60 after 12 appearances in the event. In 1949, at the age of 69, he won his second Hambletonian with Miss Tilly, a horse bred by Phellis.

=== Castleton Farm ===
After C. W. Phellis died in February 1957, Castleton Farm acquired the Phellis stable's 17 Standardbred horses. Egan, who had overseen the training and racing of the stable's horses, continued in his role and moved his training operation to the Lexington trotting track in April 1957.

On October 3, 1957, Egan added another milestone to his career by winning the Kentucky Futurity with Cassin Hanover. The win came on Egan's 78th birthday and a crowd of 5,000 at Lexington Trots sang "Happy Birthday" as he drove the filly into the winner's circle. After winning the 1957 Kentucky Futurity, he retired as an active driver.

While semi-retired, he continued to oversee the training of the small stable owned by Castleton Farm of Lexington. Egan went on to train Emily's Pride for her victory in the 1958 Hambletonian Stakes at the DuQuoin State Fairgrounds Racetrack, while Flave Nipe served as driver.

== Death ==
Fred Egan died in 1960 in Orlando, Florida, United States.

== Legacy ==
At age 78, Egan became the oldest driver to win a Trotting Triple Crown event when he captured the 1957 Kentucky Futurity with Cassin Hanover.

Egan won the Hambletonian Stakes twice as a driver and once as a trainer. In 1958, he became the oldest trainer ever to win the Hambletonian at 79 years old.

He was elected into the Hall of Fame of the Trotter in 1960.
