= Championship Stallion Stake =

American harness race for 3-year-old trotters and pacers

- Class: Harness racing
- Location: Lexington, Kentucky, U.S. (inaugural)

Race information
- Distance: 1 mile (1,609 metres or 8 furlongs)
- Track: The Red Mile (inaugural)
- Qualification: 3-year-olds

The Championship Stallion Stake was an American harness racing event established in 1910. Organized by the American Association of Trotting Horse Breeders, the stake was contested annually on the Grand Circuit.

== History ==
The Championship Stallion Stake was established in 1910 as a futurity administered by the American Association of Trotting Horse Breeders. The inaugural Championship Stallion Stake was for foals of 1907 and had 105 stallions nominated. The Championship Stallion Stake featured separate divisions for three-year-old trotters and pacers. The event was contested annually on the Grand Circuit.

The first event in 1910 was held in Lexington, Kentucky and was won by Grace, a Cleveland-owned filly driven by the veteran reinsman Mike McDevitt. Grace, the 1910 Kentucky Futurity winner, established the Championship Stallion Stake's original record of 2:08¼. The record for the event was lowered to 2:01½ in 1935 by Greyhound and equaled by Long Key in 1938. The Championship Stallion Stake was raced at North Randall, near Cleveland, Ohio, for the first time in 1916, with Volga winning the event. For many years, the event was held in Cleveland, as the opening feature of the Grand Circuit racing season. In February 1935, the Championship Stallion Stake was sold by the American Association of Trotting Horse Breeders to be hosted at the New York State Fair in Syracuse. The Trotting Horse Club of America took over the sponsorship of the Championship Stallion Stake ahead of the 1939 Grand Circuit season.

By 1953, only 11 horses won both the Championship Stallion Stake and the Hambletonian Stakes. Among them were The Marchioness, Mary Reynolds, Greyhound, Rosalind, Peter Astra, Spencer Scott, Yankee Maid, and Titan Hanover.

== Locations ==
- 1910–1915: The Red Mile, Lexington, Kentucky, U.S.
- 1916–1934: Randall Park, North Randall, Ohio, U.S.
- 1935: New York State Fairgrounds Racetrack, Syracuse, New York, U.S.
- 1936: The Red Mile, Lexington, Kentucky, U.S.
- 1937–1938: Randall Park, North Randall, Ohio, U.S.
- 1939: Indiana State Fairgrounds Speedway, Indianapolis, Indiana, U.S.
- 1940: Illinois State Fairgrounds Racetrack, Springfield, Illinois, U.S.
- 1941: Fort Miami Raceway, Toledo, Ohio, U.S.
- 1942: Saratoga Raceway, Saratoga Springs, New York, U.S.
- 1943–1945: Randall Park, North Randall, Ohio, U.S.
- 1946: Saratoga Raceway, Saratoga Springs, New York, U.S.
- 1947: Fort Miami Raceway, Toledo, Ohio, U.S.
- 1948–1952: DuQuoin State Fairgrounds Racetrack, Du Quoin, Illinois, U.S.

== Championship Stallion Stake winners ==
Championship Stallion Stake – Three-Year-Old Trot
Year	Winner	Winning driver	Fastest heat	Purse
1910	Grace	Michael McDevitt	2:08¼	$9,054.00
1911	Peter Thompson	Joseph L. Serrill	2:08½	$7,901.25
1912	Baldy McGregor	W. J. Andrews	2:06¾	$7,247.00
1913	Don Chenault	Harry C. Stinson	2:07¼	$8,270.00
1914	Peter Volo	Thomas W. Murphy	2:07¼	$9,080.00
1915	Henry Todd	C. W. Lasell	2:11¾	$10,460.00
1916	Volga	Ben White	2:05	$8,210.00
1917	Harvest Gale	Walter R. Cox	2:05¼	$7,238.75
1918	Chestnut Peter	Thomas W. Murphy	2:05¾	$7,500.00
1919	Periscope	John L. Dodge	2:06½	$9,405.00
1920	Daystar	Thomas W. Murphy	2:06¾	$10,680.00
1921	Guardian Trust	R. D. McMahon	2:06	$12,000.00
1922	Lee Worthy	Ben White	2:05	$11,050.00
1923	The Senator	Alonzo McDonald	2:07¾	$9,500.00
1924	Mr. McElwyn	Ben White	2:02¼	$9,705.00
1925	Aileen Guy	Ben White	2:03¼	$9,035.00
1926	Guy McKinney	Nat Ray	2:05¼	$11,540.00
1927	Kashmir	Thomas W. Murphy	2:03½	$10,385.00
1928	Nelly Signal	Nat Ray	2:03½	$10,800.00
1929	Walter Dear	Walter R. Cox	2:05¼	$11,205.00
1930	Hanover's Bertha	Thomas S. Berry	2:02	$10,700.00
1931	Nedda Guy	Harry M. Stokes	2:03½	$11,920.00
1932	The Marchioness	Will Caton	2:02	$12,540.00
1933	Mary Reynolds	Ben White	2:05	$11,405.00
1934	Muscletone	Hugh M. Parshall	2:03½	$5,630.00
1935	Greyhound	Sep Palin	2:01½	$8,070.00
1936	Rosalind	Ben White	2:03½	$6,635.00
1937	Schnapps	Will Caton	2:02½	$6,165.00
1938	Long Key	Ben White	2:01½	$6,185.00
1939	Peter Astra	Hugh M. Parshall	2:04½	$7,049.00
1940	Spencer Scott	Fred Egan	2:05¼	$5,725.00
1941	Lansdown	Johnny Caton	2:04¼	$7,239.00
1942	Miss Thelma	Harry Whitney	2:07	$7,338.18
1943	Phonograph	Thomas S. Berry	2:02¾	$6,805.85
1944	Yankee Maid	Henry Thomas	2:05¾	$5,321.47
1945	Titan Hanover	Harry Pownall	2:06¾	$5,893.08
1946	Onolee Hanover	Franklin Safford	2:08¼	$5,362.76
1947	Rodney	Bion Shively	2:04⅘	$6,671.66
1948	Egan Hanover	Ralph Baldwin	2:03⅗	$7,980.00
1949	Bangaway	Ralph Baldwin	2:03	$10,397.51
1950	Star's Pride	Harry Pownall	2:04⅘	$8,286.67
1951	Hattie Song	John F. Simpson Sr.	2:04⅘	$8,286.67
1952	Hit Song	Harry Pownall	2:01⅖	

Championship Stallion Stake – Three-Year-Old Pace
Year	Winner	Winning driver	Fastest heat	Purse
1910	Nell Gentry	C. E. Cameron	2:09½	$3,101.00
1911	Miss DeForest	Alonzo McDonald	2:09½	$2,658.55
1912	Director Jay	Thomas W. Murphy	2:08¾	$2,282.50
1913	Tilly Tipton	Thomas W. Murphy	2:16	$2,740.00
1914	Anna Bradford	Thomas W. Murphy	—	$1,508.75
1915	Miss Harris M.	Alonzo McDonald	2:07¼	$2,205.00
1916	Peter Look	Walter Traynor	2:10¾	$1,745.00
1917	Rex DeForest	Walter R. Cox	2:11¾	$1,378.75
1918	Peter Elliott	Alonzo McDonald	2:08¾	$1,470.00
Not raced, 1919–1930
1931	Calumet Budlong	Jake Rodman	2:04½	$1,090.00
1932	Rip Hanover	Thomas S. Berry	2:03	$1,080.00
1933	Calumet Dubuque	Harry Stokes	2:05	$975.00
1934	Laurel Hanover	C. Pierce Chappell	2:05¾	$423.80
1935	George Washington	Will Caton	2:38½	$624.01
1936	Sandydale	Sep Palin	2:01¾	$1,300.00
1937	Emmamite	Vic Fleming	2:05¼	$1,295.00
1938	Chief Counsel	Hugh M. Parshall	2:02¾	$1,580.00
1939	Blackstone	Hugh M. Parshall	2:06¾	$1,586.50
1940	Fearless Peter	Hugh M. Parshall	2:06½	$1,235.00
1941	Chamberlain	Don Miller	2:05¾	$1,406.00
1942	Supreme Hal	Franklin Safford	2:07½	$2,332.82
1943	Adios	Rupert Parker	2:01¾	$2,280.95
1944	Attorney	Art Blackwell	2:03¾	$3,390.03
1945	True Chief	Thomas S. Berry	2:07¾	$2,671.09
1946	De Sota Hanover	Harry Craig	2:07	$2,367.38
1947	Goose Bay	J. D. Mahoney	2:06⅗	$3,673.80
1948	Merry Way	Joe O'Brien	2:03	$5,458.40
1949	Stormyway	Ralph Baldwin	2:02⅕	$7,263.94
1950	Dudley Hanover	Delvin Miller	2:04⅘	$8,880.13
1951	H. D. Hanover	Ed Leonard	2:00⅗	
1952	Voting Trust	Benny Schue	2:02⅕	
