= John Dodge (harness racing) =

American harness racing driver (1865–1940)

John L. Dodge
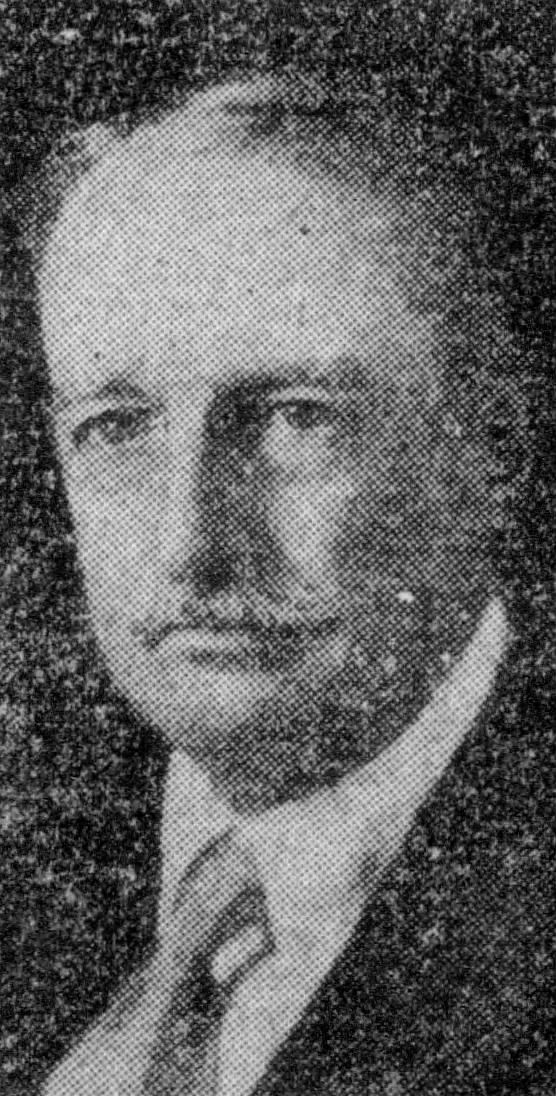
- c. 1929

Personal information
- Born: John L. Dodge Jr. September 4, 1865 Groton, Connecticut, U.S.
- Died: April 7, 1940 (aged 74) Grovetown, Georgia, U.S.
- Resting place: The Lexington Cemetery
- Occupations: Horse breeder; harness racing driver; horse trainer

Horse racing career
- Sport: Harness racing

Major racing wins
- Kentucky Futurity (1919); Horseman Futurity Trot (1919); Horseman Futurity Pace (1925); Matron Stake (1919); Championship Stallion Stake (1919); Review Futurity Trot (1919); Review Futurity Pace (1925)

Honors
- United States Harness Racing Hall of Fame (1958)

Significant horses
- Periscope

John L. Dodge (September 4, 1865 – April 7, 1940) was an American horse breeder, harness racing driver, and horse trainer.

== Early life and education ==
John Lamphere Dodge Jr. was born on 1866, in Groton, Connecticut, United States. He was the son of Cornelia M. and Dr. John Lamphere Dodge. His father was a physician who practiced in Groton, Connecticut. His paternal grandfather was Rev. Nehemiah Dodge of New London. He had three brothers: Roger N., Charles H., and Ira A. Dodge.

== Career ==
=== Bell & Co. ===
He was employed as a clerk at the Groton pharmacy in his youth. He later moved to New York City, where he became a drug salesman before traveling as a pharmaceutical sales representative for a manufacturer, marketing products directly to physicians. Around 1900, he began producing and distributing Bell's Syrup of Codeine for Coughs, a remedy based on a prescription prepared by a New York druggist named Bell. He also helped develop Pay-pa-ans Bell, later marketed as Bells-Ans, a digestive aid containing papain, which became one of the best-selling tablets of its era. Dodge served as president of Bell & Co., a pharmaceutical manufacturing company headquartered in New York City. His son Joseph Dodge joined Bell & Co., Inc. in 1926 and eventually succeeded him as president of the company.

=== Track Owner ===
He purchased a track in Orangeburg, New York in 1902 and established a stock farm. At Orangeburg, he began racing horses, initially employing a professional trainer and driver while also driving his own horses on the minor circuits. Driving Redinda on eastern speedways marked Dodge's entry into harness racing. He had Redinda when he first began breeding at the Orangeburg track. After the pacing mare's racing career ended, he bred her to Bingen, producing the pacing colt King Cole. Dodge also bred Joe Dodge, a trotting stallion and full brother to King Cole.

He helped build the Harlem River Speedway. At the beginning of 1904, he was elected president of the Road Drivers' Association of New York City, a group of horsemen who raced on the course.

In 1905, he bought a 60-acre apple orchard at the foot of Clausland Mountain Park and moved his business out from New York City. He located his business in Rockland County to be near the Rockland County Fairgrounds race track. In the early days, the medicine factory output was hauled into New York City twice a week by a six-mule team.

=== Hollyrood Farm ===
Dodge purchased the first Hollyrood Stock Farm in 1909, located at Circleville, New York, a few miles from Middletown, New York. The horses bred on the farm all had the name of Hollyrood attached to them. After acquiring Hollyrood Farm, he bought few horses, racing the products of his own breeding operations. He abandoned the use of a professional trainer, taking charge of preparing and driving his horses himself. Though retaining his amateur driver status, he raced against the professionals each week of the Grand Circuit for many years.

In 1912, he bought a 315-acre Bluegrass farm near Lexington, Kentucky. He transferred his operation to Lexington after buying the farm from the late George Whitney, a noted breeder of thoroughbreds. The farm was situated on the Harrodsburg Pike. He spent the spring and fall in Kentucky. Around this time, he also bought a farm and mile track at Grovetown, Georgia, where he spent each winter and trained his horses.

He purchased Lady Wanetka by Peter the Great mid-season from reinsman Walter R. Cox in 1913. She was one of the few trotters he left with the trainer after purchase. The filly was taken over by Dodge at the close of her three-year-old campaign but was lost in a fire a short while later at Grovetown. He eventually switched breeds from the Bingen family to Peter the Great in which his first crop of foals were Hollyrood Bob and Hollyrood Naomi.

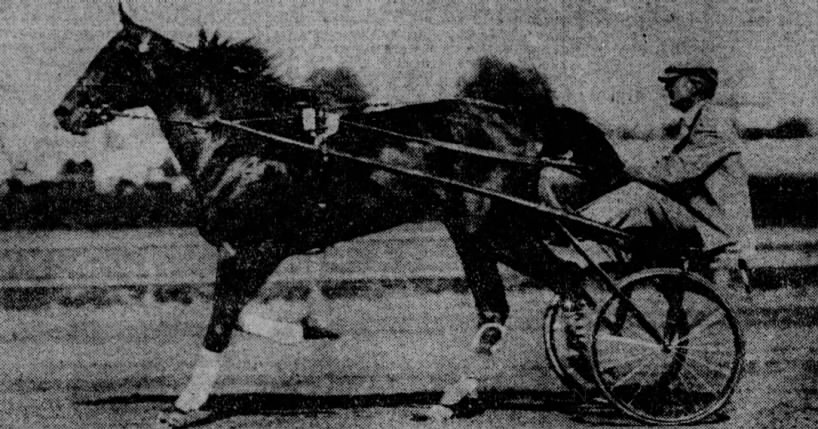
John L. Dodge driving Periscope (2:03¼), The New York Herald, c. 1921

Periscope, bred by John E. Madden, was another noted trotter who was added to the Dodge outfit in 1918. The filly came into his stable as a two-year-old, and she went on to compete successfully for him, capturing the 1919 Kentucky Futurity.

Following the death of J. D. Grover, Dodge was elected to the board of directors of the Kentucky Trotting Horse Breeders' Association in 1925. He was elected a director of the Hambletonian Society on October 4, 1929.

He and his wife founded the Gentleman's Driving Club of Lexington in 1931.

=== Semi-Retirement ===
Dodge retired from active driving in 1932, but came back later with Hollyrood Dennis. The trotter owned by Dodge's Hollyrood Farm won a heat of the Hambletonian Stakes in the fastest time ever clocked for the event at 2:01¼. He was back racing by 1933, but he became less active during the mid-1930s. He went on to drive Hollyrood Portia in the 1933 Hambletonian. He was the eldest reinsman in the race.

In 1933, he helped organize the Trotting Horse Club of America along with William Neal Reynolds, E. Roland Harriman, and William H. Cane. He served as the secretary.

At the age of 73, he drove Hollyrood Happy Thought and Hollywood Hera to victories at Aiken, South Carolina in 1939.

== Personal life ==
His first wife was Fannie S. Cothell. When the couple divorced, he married Elizabeth Taylor in Palm Beach, Florida, on January 18, 1915. He met her at the Bretton Hall Hotel, where the Dodges kept winter quarters. She was a noted driver who in 1934 guided Hollyrood Portia to win a women's world exhibition record for trotters driven a mile on a half-mile track.

== Death ==
John L. Dodge died on April 7, 1940, in Grovetown, Georgia, United States, at 74 years old.

== Legacy ==
In 1921, Dodge became the first driver to record mile heats of better than 2:04 with three different trotters. He was regarded by many as the leading breeder of 2:05 trotters.

He was inducted into the United States Harness Racing Hall of Fame in 1958.
