= Nat Ray =

Canadian horse racing driver and trainer (1882–1953)

Personal information
- Born: Nathaniel Daniel Ray; 1882 Whitby, Ontario, Canada
- Died: March 3, 1953 (aged 70–71) Orlando, Florida, U.S.
- Occupations: Jockey; Harness racing driver Horse trainer

Horse racing career
- Sport: Horse racing

Major racing wins
- Transylvania Trot (1922); Horseman Futurity (1922); Matron Stake (1926, 1928); Kentucky Futurity (1926); Hambletonian Stakes (1926); Championship Stallion Stake (1926)

Honors
- U.S. Harness Racing Hall of Fame (1978); Canadian Horse Racing Hall of Fame (1981)

Memorials
- Nat Ray Memorial

Significant horses
- Good and Plenty

Nat Ray (1882 – March 3, 1953) was a Canadian steeplechase jockey, harness racing driver, and horse trainer who drove the first winner of the Hambletonian Stakes in 1926. He was posthumously inducted into the U. S. Harness Racing Hall of Fame in 1978 and the Canadian Horse Racing Hall of Fame in 1981.

== Early life ==
Nathaniel Daniel Ray was born in the town of Whitby in Ontario, Canada, in 1882. He was the son of Charles Ray, who was a noted horseman.

== Career ==
=== Steeplechase career ===
Known as "Nat," he began his career as a jockey in Toronto, Ontario. In 1896, he relocated to the United States to pursue his career as a jockey and steeplechase rider. That year, he rode his first winning horse at Latonia Race Track.

As a jockey, he rode for prominent racing establishments, including the stable of James D. Widener and Charles Adams, former owner of the Boston Braves. He rode horses for Thomas Hitchcock Sr. for five years.

During the 1904 steeplechase season, he won every stake race in New York except one, which was won by Harry Stone. Ray won the $15,000 Champion Steeplechase Handicap with Good and Plenty. For his victory in the event that year, he was awarded $5,000 in cash and a diamond stud. He was offered $10,000 to ride for one of England's largest racing stables for the 1905 season and received offers from two prominent American owners. Ray rode Hylas to back-to-back wins in the Champion Steeplechase Handicap, making it three straight years that he had won the race.

By 1906, the Canadian jockey had achieved success in major competitions and became one of the wealthiest steeplechase riders in the United States. During the summer of 1906, he declined an offer from King Edward VII, as important stake engagements involving the Hitchcock string prevented him from travelling at the time.

Ray won the Grand National Hurdle Stakes at Belmont Park four times, with his final victory marking the end of an 18-year riding career.

=== Harness racing career ===
After the Jockey Club abandoned racing in New York State in 1911, he retired and devoted himself to Standardbred trotters and pacers. He established his stable at Dufferin Park Racetrack. The former steeplechase jockey competed on the Grand Circuit, where he proved himself as a harness racing driver and trainer. One of his early patrons was Toronto sportsman J. E. Gray, for whom he campaigned the pacer Grattan Royal.

When a trotter named Day Spring came into his stable, he put him on hobbles and turned him into a pacer. During the winter season of 1915–1916, Ray campaigned him over the Canadian ice circuit and set the world's pacing records over the ice at 2:12¼. He took the pacer to the United States and won 12 of 13 races while competing over half-mile tracks during the 1916 season. He relocated his winter quarters to Mount Clemens, Michigan.

In 1922, he drove Peter Earl to a win in the Horseman Futurity at the Indiana State Fair. At the time, he also trained Peter the Brewer, a son of Peter the Great. He won the 34th running of the Transylvania Trot with Peter the Brewer at the Lexington track on October 5, 1922. He drove the horse to a time of 2:02½, equalling the record set by Peter Manning in 1920.

He later trained and drove Guy McKinney, a three-year-old trotter owned by Henry B. Rea. The horse had been unsuccessful as a two-year-old but improved under Ray's training. Driving Guy McKinney in July 1926, he won the Matron Stake and then won the 1926 Championship Stallion Stake. He was among the original drivers in the first Hambletonian Stakes ever held on August 31, 1926. He won the Hambletonian with Guy McKinney in straight heats. The event at the New York State Fair in Syracuse, New York carried a purse over $73,000. He went on to capture the 1926 Kentucky Futurity with Guy McKinney in Lexington.

Following his 1926 run, Ray returned to compete in the Hambletonian Stakes, finishing fourth in 1927 and fifth in 1928. He won the Matron Stake and the Championship Stallion Stake with Nelly Signal in 1928.

=== Later career ===
He began training Thoroughbreds for flat racing, and between 1931 and 1941, he trained many of the decade's winners of running and trotting stakes. In 1942, jockey Red Pollard, best known for riding Seabiscuit, began driving for Ray's stable.

During the later years of his career, he carried out most of his racing around New York at Roosevelt Raceway and Yonkers Raceway. The veteran reinsman was injured in an accident at Yonkers Raceway in October 1952. He never fully recovered from the serious injuries that he received.

== Death ==
Nat Ray died on March 3, 1953, in Orlando, Florida, United States. He had been in Orlando for off-season training of his stable.

== Legacy ==
Ray was a 1978 inductee of the U.S. Harness Racing Hall of Fame's Hall of Immortals. He was inducted into the Canadian Horse Racing Hall of Fame in 1981.

The Nat Ray Memorial, an annual race held at Meadowlands Racetrack, was named in his honour. The race was replaced by the John Cashman Jr. Memorial in 2013.
