= Hugh M. Parshall =

American harness racing driver (1898–1950)

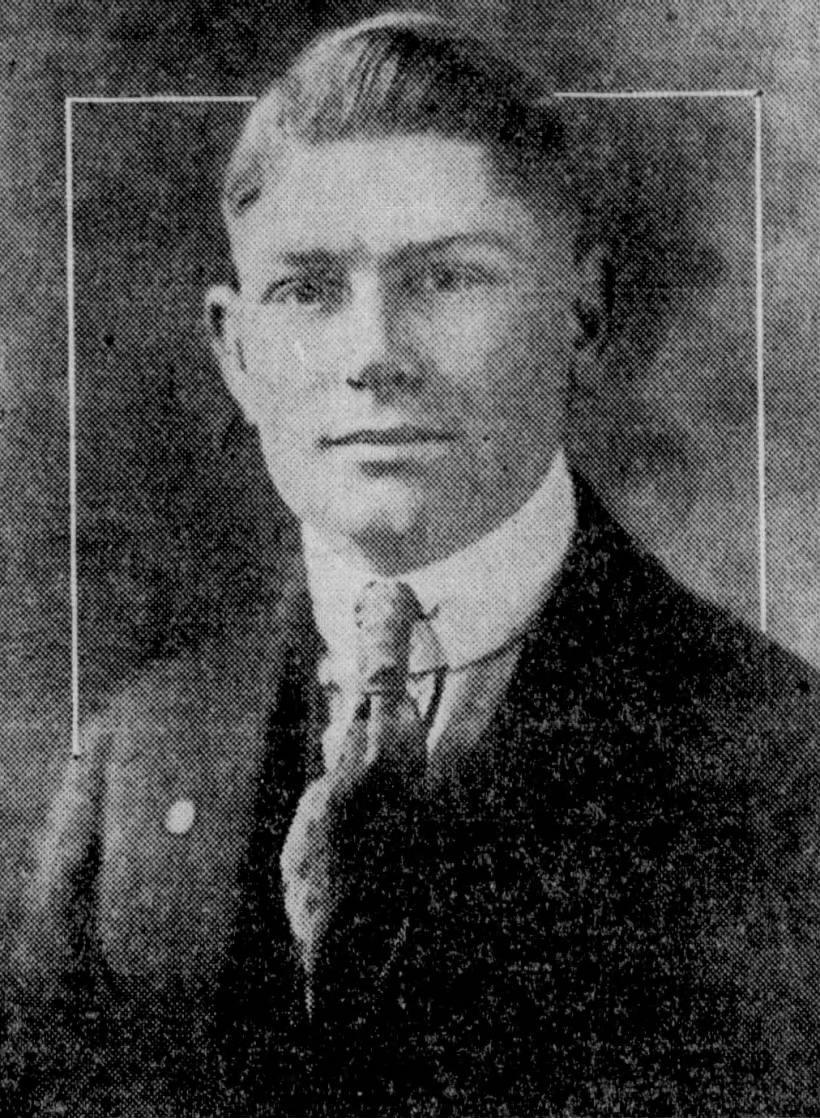

Personal information
- Nickname: Doc
- Born: Hugh Maynard Parshall; December 21, 1898 Hillsboro, Ohio, U.S.
- Died: November 29, 1950 (aged 51) Urbana, Ohio, U.S.
- Resting place: Oakdale Cemetery
- Occupations: Harness racing driver; horse trainer; veterinarian
- Years active: 1920-1948

Horse racing career
- Sport: Harness racing

Major racing wins
- Hambletonian Stakes (1934, 1939); Championship Stallion Stake (1938, 1939, 1940); Review Futurity Pace (1931, 1935, 1938, 1939, 1940, 1941); Review Futurity Trot (1933, 1934, 1939); Historic-Dickerson Cup (1939, 1941); Horseman Futurity (1938, 1943); Matron Stake (1938, 1939, 1940)

Honors
- United States Harness Racing Hall of Fame (2004)

Hugh M. "Doc" Parshall (December 21, 1898 – November 29, 1950) was an American harness racing driver, horse trainer, and veterinarian who won the Hambletonian Stakes twice and was among the sport's leading drivers during the 1930s.

== Early life and education ==
Hugh Maynard Parshall was born in Hillsboro, Ohio, United States, on December 21, 1898.

His father provided him with $500 to attend college, but he used the money instead to purchase a filly pacer and began training her for competition. Parshall launched his driving career in 1920 with Princess Mac, a bay mare he acquired for $150. Competing at local fairs across six towns, he recorded three victories in six starts before selling her for $1,400. He returned the original $500 to his father, took the profit, and enrolled to study veterinary medicine. After graduating from the Indiana Veterinary College in Indianapolis in 1921, he returned to Hillsboro, Ohio, where his family had settled.

== Career ==
Doc Parshall gained further experience with another one-horse pacing stable, driving Fondabelle beginning in 1921. He campaigned his first public stable in 1923. He was 24 years old when he began training the stable at the Fayette County fairgrounds in Washington Court House, Ohio, establishing himself as a leading trainer-driver during his twenties. During the early part of his career, he devoted his racing to the Ohio and Central States circuits before appearing at Grand Circuit meetings. In late 1927, he moved his training operation from Washington Court House to the Champaign County fairgrounds in Urbana, Ohio, where more stalls were available for his growing stable.

Parshall ranked first among drivers on the Grand Circuit with 50 victories in 1927 and drove Dr. Volo to a second-place finish in the $25,000 American Pacing Derby at Kalamazoo, Michigan. Following Thomas W. Murphy's retirement after the 1927 season, he was bequeathed Murphy's red, white, and blue racing colors.

He recorded 35 wins in 1928 and placed third in the year's rankings. He was the leading reinsman in 1929, recording more than 55 wins. The highlight of his 1929 season came when he guided Counterpart to a straight-heat victory in the $25,000 American Pacing Derby. He had purchased the eight-year-old pacer in 1927 after the horse had been away from racing for two years. Parshall set a new all-time record in 1930 with 76 victories in a single season. In 1931, he topped the standings with 56 winning horses. He ranked first in wins in 1932 and 1933 with 68 and 67 victories, respectively. He narrowly missed the top spot in 1934 after recording 58 wins. That season, he still had the most number of races and purse money won.

=== Hambletonian Stakes ===
In his 1934 campaign, he had a pair of three-year-olds in his stable, Lord Jim and Muscletone. He raced Lord Jim on behalf of its Columbus owner, while also campaigning his own colt, Muscletone. He went on to win his first Hambletonian Stakes with Lord Jim in 1934. Parshall, then 35, was the youngest driver ever to win the harness race at the time. His younger brother, Daryl, drove Muscletone to a second-place finish. The race marked the first time brothers finished first and second in the Hambletonian.

The Grand Circuit driver continued his run in the mid-1930s, leading with 46 victories in 1935, 48 in 1936, and 54 in 1937, extending his streak to nine consecutive seasons. He followed with 49 victories in 1938. During the 1938 season, he had three of the Grand Circuit's top four money-winning horses in the two- and three-year-old classes. His stable included Chief Counsel, the world champion three-year-old pacer, Peter Astra, the champion two-year-old trotter, and Blackstone, the leading two-year-old pacer who won 11 of 12 starts.

Parshall entered Peter Astra in the 1939 Hambletonian Stakes, where the colt earned him his second victory in the event. He joined Ben White and Henry Thomas as the only drivers at that time to have won the classic more than once. In 1939, he recorded 57 victories to lead the circuit and earned $84,000 as the leading money-winning trainer. He also led all drivers with 150 heats won and drove his 11th two-minute performer, more than any other driver in the sport's history at the time. After leading the standings in previous seasons, he finished second in 1940 behind Harry Fitzpatrick with 39 races won, and also trailed him in heat victories. Parshall, however, retained his position as the top money-winning driver with over $47,000. That year, he drove Chief Counsel to a time of 1:57 3/4, then a world championship record for three-year-old pacers.

=== Race starter and semi-retirement ===
He accepted a position as a race starter during the summer of 1943. He limited his racing activities in 1943 to the pacer King's Counsel and worked as an official at six meetings. Parshall and Vermont horseman E. T. Cray jointly owned King's Counsel, who had success during his two seasons under Parshall's guidance. In September 1943, the three-year-old pacing colt was sold to Edward J. Baker for $20,000. At the end of the 1943 season, Parshall had been the Grand Circuit's number one race-winning driver 14 times.

Following his successful completion of the Ohio examination for veterinary surgeons in 1944, he stepped away from "big time" driving. He continued officiating as a race starter until 1947. Parshall did not race between 1944 and 1947.

=== Hayes Fair Acres Stable ===
The Ohio-born horseman joined the Hayes Fair Acres Stable of Du Quoin, Illinois as head trainer in 1947. During the 1948 season, Parshall earned $91,948 in purses, placing him third among the sport's leading money-winning drivers.

While serving as trainer for Hayes Fair Acres Stable, he hand-picked every horse in the stable. He purchased Lusty Song as a yearling for $7,600. Under his guidance, the colt emerged as a leading candidate for the 1950 Hambletonian and captured the event. Lusty Song's two-year-old campaign under Parshall included 32 starts and 19 wins, both records for a Hambletonian winner.

=== Retirement ===
In the winter of 1949, he suffered a heart attack while on vacation in Redlands, California. Ongoing health issues led to his retirement as head trainer of the Hayes Fair Acres stables in April 1950. He was replaced by Foy Funderburk.

== Death ==
Hugh M. Parshall died on November 29, 1950, in Urbana, Ohio, United States.

== Legacy ==
The year after Parshall's death in 1950, Col. Alden Gray, then general manager of both Roosevelt Raceway and the Lexington Trots, established the Doc Parshall Memorial Race. The annual $5,000 pace for three-year-old colts and geldings was named in his memory and sponsored during the Grand Circuit meeting in Lexington, Kentucky.

Parshall was inducted into the Hall of Fame of the Trotter in 2004.
