= Rosalind (harness horse) =

American Standardbred racehorse

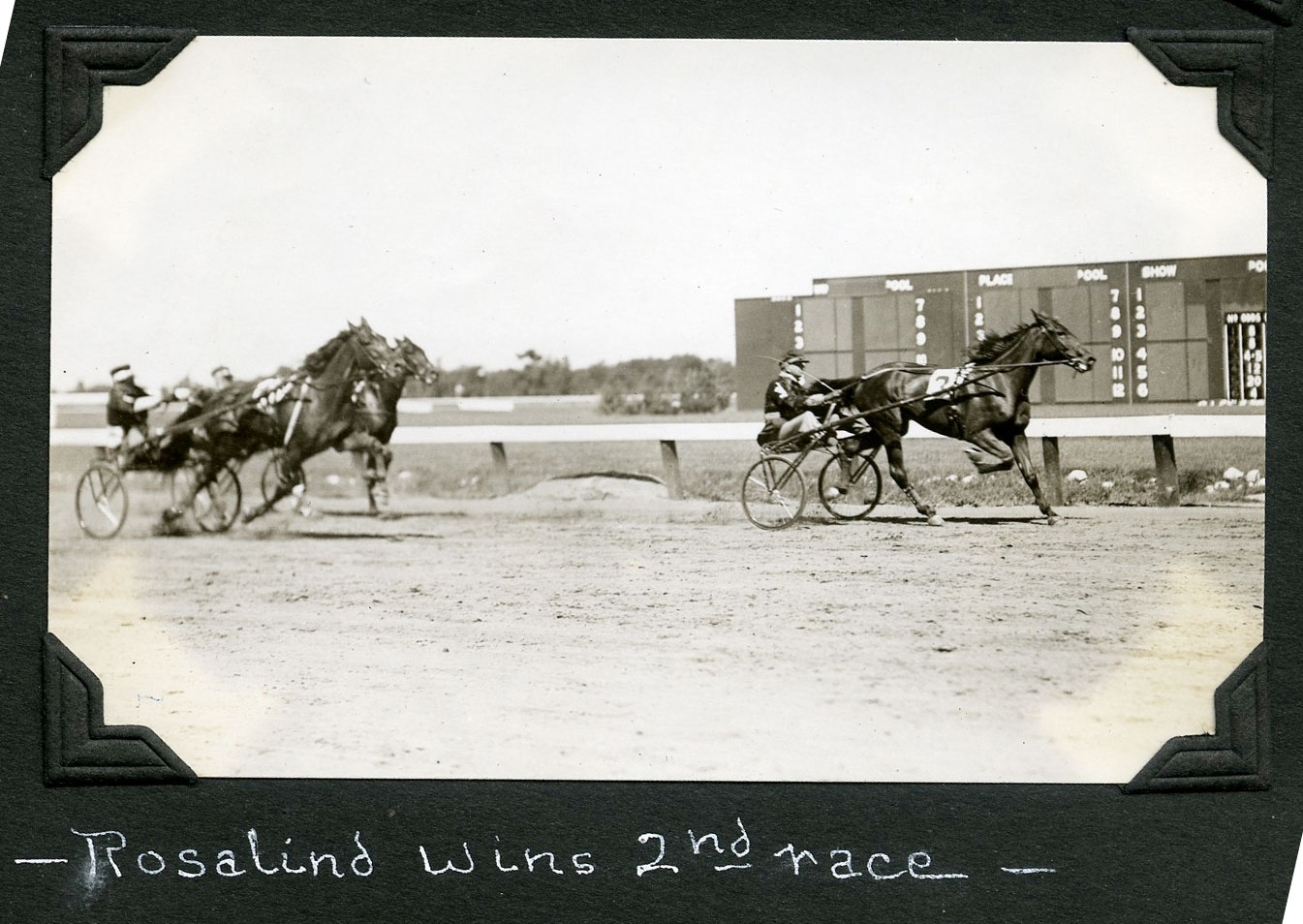
- Rosalind winning her second start in August 1935
- Breed: Standardbred
- Sire: Scotland
- Grandsire: Peter Scott
- Dam: Alma Lee
- Damsire: Lee Worthy
- Sex: Female
- Foaled: May 5, 1933
- Died: October 26, 1950
- Country: United States
- Color: Bay
- Breeder: Ben White
- Owner: Gib White
- Trainer: Ben White
- Record: 1:56¾
- Earnings: $64,450

Major wins
- Hambletonian Stakes, Kentucky Futurity (two- and three-year-old divisions, 1935 and 1936), All American Stake Trotting Handicap (1937)

Honors
- Harness Racing Hall of Fame (1973)

Rosalind was a champion trotting mare who won the 1936 Hambletonian Stakes, set two world records (an individual filly-and-mare record of 1:56¾ in 1938 and a 1939 team mark of 1:58¼ with Greyhound) and was elected to the Harness Racing Hall of Fame in 1973. Foaled on May 5, 1933, she was sired by Scotland (1:59¼); her dam was Alma Lee (2:04¾), whose sire was Lee Worthy (2:02½). Scotland was sired by Peter Scott, who was sired by Peter The Great, who was sired by Pilot Medium, who was sired by Happy Medium, who was sired by Hambletonian 10. Alma Lee was also a great-great-great-great-granddaughter of Hambletonian 10.

Owned by Gib White and bred, trained and driven by his father, Ben White, Rosalind won six of ten races as a two-year-old. She won seven of eight starts at three, including the Hambletonian at Good Time Park in Goshen, New York. The filly's fastest mile in the race (the Hambletonian was contested in heats at the time, both of which she won) was 2:01¾, a stakes record. The following year, Rosalind won three of her four starts and set a world record of 1:56 3/4. As a six-year-old in 1939, she and Greyhound (both driven by Sep Palin) lowered the world team-to-pole (tandem) record to 1:59 at Syracuse and 1:58¼ at Indianapolis. Rosalind won twenty-four races during her career, finished second seven times and third once.

As a broodmare she gave birth to six fillies, the best-known of whom was Deanna (2:02¾). Rosalind died at age 17 of cancer at Hanover Shoe Farms in Hanover, Pennsylvania, and is buried there. She, Ben and Gib White were the subjects of Marguerite Henry's 1950 Born to Trot, illustrated by Wesley Dennis.

== See also ==
- Standardbred
