= Thomas W. Murphy (harness racing) =

American harness racing driver and horse trainer (1877–1967)

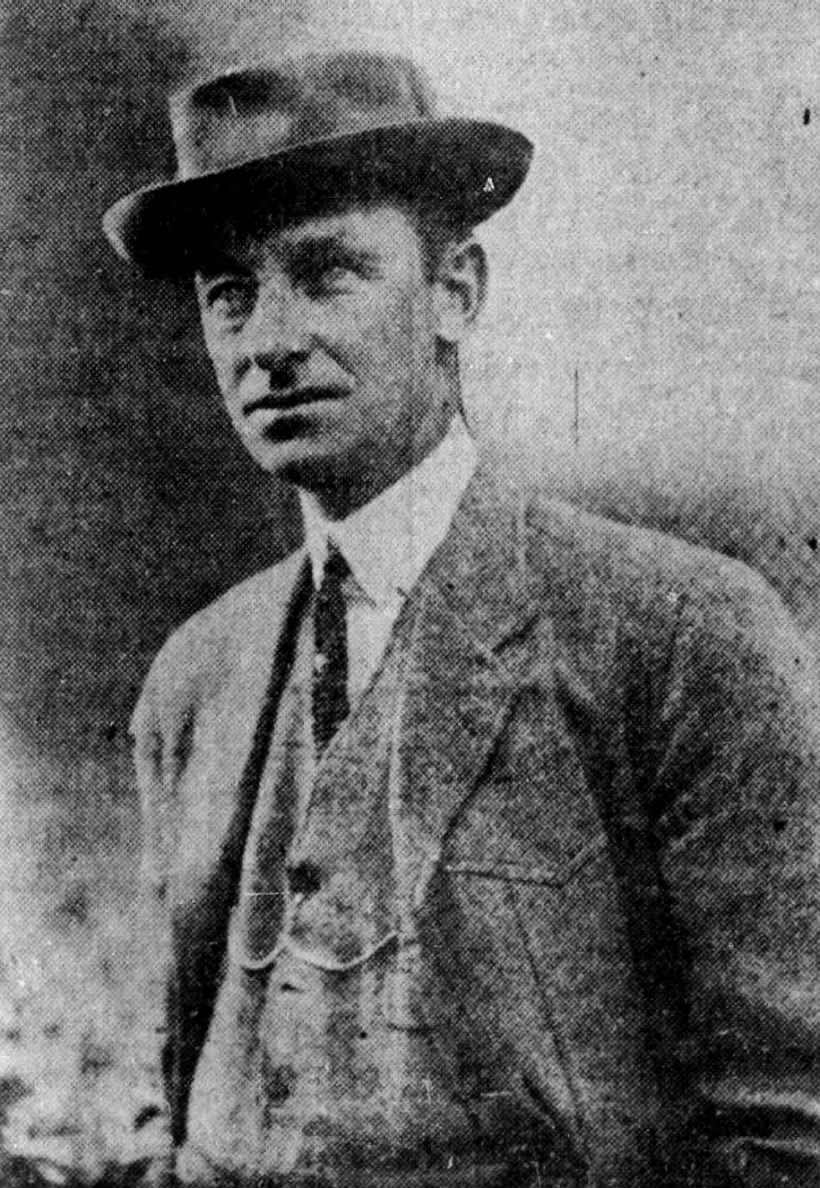

Personal information
- Other names: Wizard of the Reins
- Born: Thomas W. Murphy; 1877 Glen Cove, Long Island, U.S.
- Died: March 20, 1967 (aged 89–90) Poughkeepsie, New York, U.S.
- Occupations: Harness racing driver; horse trainer
- Years active: 1900-1927

Horse racing career
- Sport: Harness racing

Major racing wins
- Kentucky Futurity (1909, 1914, 1917, 1921); Walnut Hall Cup (1911, 1915, 1918, 1924, 1925); Transylvania Trot (1911, 1915, 1923, 1924, 1925); Matron Stake Pace (1912, 1913, 1914, 1916); Championship Stallion Stake Trot (1914, 1918, 1920, 1927); Horseman Futurity Pace (1919, 1921, 1922, 1926)

Honors
- United States Harness Racing Hall of Fame (1967)

Thomas W. Murphy (1877 – March 20, 1967) was an American harness racing driver and horse trainer.

== Early life ==
Thomas W. Murphy was born in 1877 in Glen Cove, Long Island, United States.

== Career ==
Murphy drove his first race at 14 years old. He eventually relocated from his hometown of Glen Cove to Poughkeepsie, New York, in the early 1900s. Upon establishing his stable at Poughkeepsie, the Long Island horseman had 26 horses in his care. The area was then one of the regular stops on the Grand Circuit, a series of race meetings held at county seats and county fairs. The Glen Cove native made his debut as a Grand Circuit driver around 1906.

His first champion trotter was Native Belle, whose mile in 2:07¾ in 1909 broke an 18-year-old record held by Arion. Following the 1909 season, Murphy became the leading money-winning driver for the first time, earning $66,387.94. He finished second the following year behind Ed Geers, who led the standings, with Murphy's earnings totaling $42,912.69. He set a new single-season earnings record in 1911, winning $86,110 during the campaign. He went on to win $65,389 in 1912, $73,885 in 1913, and $100,249.25 in 1914. He became the first reinsman to earn over $100,000 in a single season.

In 1920, he bought a 54-acre property in Poughkeepsie for a reported $25,000. The property, located near the Hudson River Driving Park, had served as the site of his training stable for nearly five years before he purchased it.

Murphy finished as the leading reinsman in 1921 with 45 victories. Roy Grattan, a Canadian-bred gelding, was the stable's top performer with nine wins. He recorded his fastest drive in 1922 at Lexington, Kentucky, guiding Peter Manning to a 1:56¾ mile. The record stood for 16 years before being broken by Greyhound in 1938. By 1923, Murphy had surpassed $1 million in career purse earnings as a harness racing driver. Horses driven by Murphy won 64 of the 264 races contested on the Grand Circuit of 1923, the highest total among drivers. Following the close of the 1923 season, he moved his permanent residence and training stable to Syracuse, New York. Murphy topped the driver standings in 1924, winning 53 of the 265 Grand Circuit races. Tilly Brooke, Etta Druien, Czarworthy, and Baron Worthy were his leading campaigners. He led the 1925 season with 59 races to his credit. The Murphy stable produced 23 winners in 1926, with Murphy himself driving 16 of the victories and Harry Stokes accounting for the remainder.

=== Retirement ===
Murphy retired in 1927 after 37 years' active participation as a driver and trainer of trotters and pacers. Within days of announcing his retirement, he received more than 175 letters and telegrams in appreciation of his contributions to harness racing.

==== Thoroughbred Racing ====
Murphy entered thoroughbred racing following his retirement at age 50, joining Greentree Stable as a trainer. His first action after taking over the stable at Belmont Park was remodelling the barn. Over the course of three seasons, he developed 111 winners as a trainer. Murphy also trained the thoroughbred racehorse Twenty Grand for his victory in the 1931 Kentucky Derby.

==== Return to Harness Racing ====
He returned to harness racing in 1951, resuming his career as a trainer. Murphy achieved further recognition as the trainer of Kimberly Kid, who was named 1955 Horse of the Year. Bullet Hanover, another horse trained by Murphy, set a world record for two-year-olds with a mile time of 1:57 in 1959.

== Personal life ==
He had three sons, Thomas W. Jr., Alfred T., and Oliver A. Murphy.

== Death ==
Murphy died on March 20, 1967, in Poughkeepsie, New York, at the age of 90.

== Legacy ==
T. W. Murphy was harness racing's leading money-winning driver in 16 of his 19 seasons from 1909 to 1927. His success on the track during the 1920s earned him the title the "Wizard of the Reins." He established the first sub-two-minute race records in both gaits. He drove Tilly Brooke to a 1:59 mile in 1924, making her the first trotter to break the two-minute barrier, and guided Frank Bogash Jr. to the first sub-two-minute record by a pacer.

He was elected to the United States Harness Racing Hall of Fame as part of the 1967 induction class.
