= Will Caton =

American harness racing driver and trainer (1877–1943)

Personal information
- Born: William F. Caton; March 29, 1877 Wyandotte, Michigan, U.S.
- Died: July 2, 1943 (aged 66) Cleveland, Ohio, U.S.
- Occupations: Harness racing driver Horse trainer

Horse racing career
- Sport: Harness racing

Major racing wins
- Championship Stallion Stake (1932, 1935, 1937); Hambletonian Stakes (1932); Horseman Futurity (1931, 1932, 1934); Kentucky Futurity (1931, 1932); Matron Stake (1931, 1935, 1937); Review Futurity (1931, 1932); Walnut Hall Cup (1938)

Honors
- U.S. Harness Racing Hall of Fame (1958)

William Caton (March 29, 1877 – July 2, 1943) was an American harness racing driver and horse trainer who drove The Marchioness to victory in the 1932 Hambletonian Stakes. He was elected to the U.S. Harness Racing Hall of Fame in 1958.

== Early life ==
William F. Caton was born in Wyandotte, Michigan, United States on March 29, 1877. He was one of five children born to Frank and Sarah Featherstone Caton.

His father, Frank Caton, was a Hall of Fame harness racing trainer. As a young boy, he moved to Cleveland, Ohio, where his father became superintendent of the Forest City Stock Farm in North Randall. He assisted his father at the farm owned by Christopher F. Emery. He worked for him for three years. At 14 years old, he first drove the mare, Patron S., at the old Longview track.

== Career ==
=== Early harness racing career ===
A young Will Caton caught the attention of Grand Duke Nicholas at the 1893 Chicago World's Fair, where he won two races at the age of 16. He was offered an opportunity to race in Russia. His father accepted a proposition to introduce American trotters to the Russian population. He soon traveled to Russia with his family in February 1894. With his father's permission, he became head trainer for S. N. Konshine, remaining with him for eight years. He won many races, including the Grand Prix in Paris in 1901. When the demand for his services grew, he established a public stable. He piloted horses belonging to Tsar Nicholas II, Grand Duke Nicholas Nikolaevich, and other members of the Russian Imperial Family. He spent 11 years driving for the tsar.

He captured the 1912 European Derby with Fatalist in Moscow. Fatalist recorded a mark of 2:09¼ and won a gross of $93,000.

=== Lezhneff Stable ===
Caton later signed a five-year contract with Russian sportsman Vladimir Lezhneff, who paid him $20,000 a year for his services as a trainer and driver. He also received 15% of the stable's earnings. His horses won $250,000 in purses in 1914.

By 1917, Caton held European driving records for three-year-old and four-year-old horses, as well as stallions and mares, at both one and two miles.

=== Russian Revolution ===
His contract with Lezhneff ended amid the outbreak of the Russian Revolution. During the winter of 1917, Caton attempted to escape the country through Siberia and was detained by the Bolsheviks. He was ordered to breed and train horses for the government stock farm. Owing to his experience with horses, he supervised the central training remount station in Tomsk, where horses were developed for use by the army. He was held hostage until Herbert Hoover began distributing relief food. With the assistance of the American Relief Administration, he was released on December 19, 1921, after nearly four years. He was allowed to travel by train to Petrograd, arriving on January 19, 1922. Caton then boarded the USS Olympia and arrived in New York in February 1922.

When he rejoined his family in North Randall, he had lost much of the wealth he accumulated in Europe. His brother-in-law, William Rosemire, then trainer of the Pastime stable, requested his help with preparing horses in Thomasville, Georgia. After the winter training season, he returned to Cleveland and continued working with the Pastime horses. Caton made appearances at the North Randall, Cranwood, and Brook Park tracks.

=== K. Stable ===
His first major contract was signed in 1926 when he began training for Francis B. Mitchell of Rochester, New York. In 1927, he became head trainer for Ralph Keeler. Caton first distinguished himself as a driver of Protector. He selected the trotter at an Old Glory sale for $1,000. He was responsible for developing the Peter Volo colt, which was owned by Keeler's K. Stable in Auburn, New York. He went on to win the Kentucky Futurity with Protector in 1931. Protector was sold for $30,000 after winning $38,000 in stakes.

=== 1932 Hambletonian Stakes ===
He trained and drove The Marchioness, a full sister of Protector. The filly was acquired for $2,100. When Keeler died in October 1931, he left his horses to Caton, with the exception of The Marchioness, which belonged to his wife. In Caton's first appearance in the Hambletonian Stakes in 1932, he drove The Marchioness to victory at Good Time Park in Goshen, New York. He won two of the race's four heats, securing the championship by winning the deciding fourth heat. Later that year, Caton won the Kentucky Futurity for the second consecutive year, driving The Marchioness.

In his other Hambletonian attempts, he finished fourth with Vitamine in 1934 and second with Warwell Worthy in 1935. He later took a fifth-place finish with Schnapps in 1937 and seventh with The Duchess in 1938. He also won the 1938 Walnut Hall Cup with Havoline.

Toward the end of his career, Caton operated his own public stable and occasionally worked alongside Ben White.

== Death ==
Will Caton died in Bedford, Ohio, United States on July 2, 1943, following a prolonged illness.

== Legacy ==
During his 25-year career in Europe, he won 2,343 races and eight European Trotting Derbies. While in Russia, he received his designation as "The Driver with the Golden Hands". By the early 1930s, he had earned over $2,000,000 in purses.

In 1958, Caton was posthumously elected to the U.S. Harness Racing Hall of Fame.
