= Walnut Hall Cup =

Harness stakes race for 2-year-old trotters

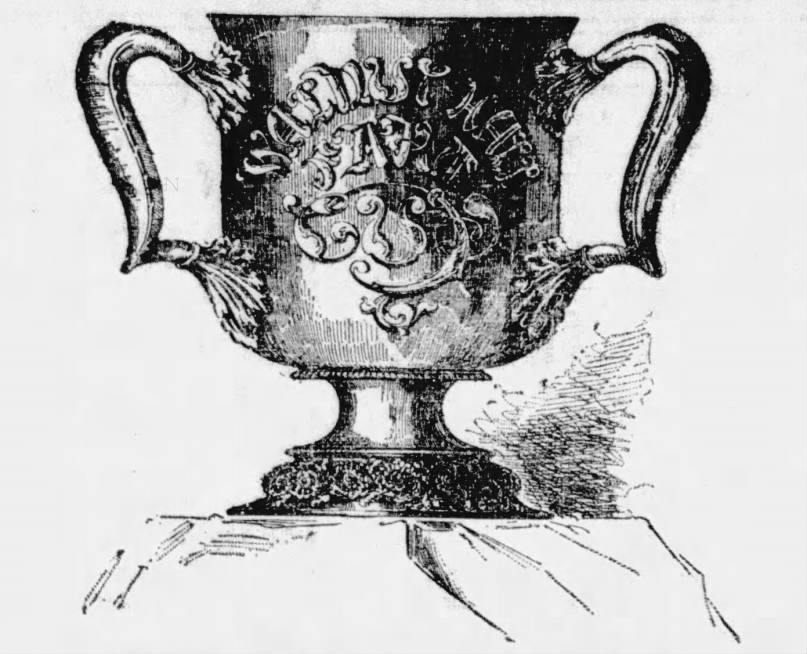
- Location: Lexington, Kentucky, U.S. (inaugural)
- Inaugurated: 1897
- Race type: Harness race for standardbred trotters

Race information
- Distance: 1 mile (1,609 metres or 8 furlongs)
- Surface: Dirt/Clay
- Track: The Red Mile (inaugural)
- Qualification: 2:17 class (1897; inaugural); 2-year-old trotters (present)

The Walnut Hall Cup was a harness racing event for standardbred trotters. The inaugural race took place at the Red Mile in Lexington, Kentucky, in 1897.

== History ==
In April 1897, the Kentucky Trotting Horse Breeders' Association's board of directors established its annual fixed program of events and added the Walnut Hall Farm Cup as a new stakes feature. Lamon V. Harkness, then owner and operator of the Walnut Hall stock farm, presented the owner of the winning trotters an inscribed sterling silver cup trophy worth $500. The original cup, crafted by Tiffanys, stood 10 inches high and 11 inches across the handles, with an inside diameter of more than seven inches. It featured three large handles, a heavy carved base, and a gold-lined interior. One side read "Walnut Hall Farm Cup" in raised letters, and the other side was left for the winner's inscription. A purse of $2,500 was offered by the association. The first Walnut Hall Cup was held at the Red Mile in Lexington, Kentucky, on October 12, 1897. The first horse to win was The Monk, driven by Edward Geers, winning three of four closely contested heats.

Early on, eligibility for the Walnut Hall Cup was defined by time classes that progressively evolved over time. The eligibility of the inaugural race was for the 2:17 class of trotters. By 1911, the Walnut Hall Cup was, alongside the Transylvania, considered the most highly prized aged race sponsored by the association. The all-aged event formed part of the Lexington Grand Circuit program and became the secondary feature to the Kentucky Futurity at the Kentucky Trotting Horse Breeders Association track.

After the death of L. V. Larkness in 1915, the silver trophy continued to be awarded by Walnut Hall Farm, then operated by his estate. Larkness's son-in-law, Dr. Odgen M. Edwards Jr., who became head of Walnut Hall Farm, went on to donate the trophy. The Walnut Hall Farm tradition was later continued by its owners Katherine and H. Willis Nichols Jr.

The first Walnut Hall-bred winner of the race came in 1921, when Alonzo 'Lon' McDonald drove Jeanette Rankin.

The Walnut Hall Cup became one of Lexington's oldest features. The historic race developed into an event for two-year-old trotting colts ahead of the 1970 Grand Circuit program, and by the mid-1980s it was an important stepping stone toward the Breeders Crown.

It was eventually featured as the Walnut Hall Limited Cup alongside the Bluegrass Stakes program for two-year-old colt trotters and filly pacers at the Red Mile.

== Distances ==
When introduced in 1897, the Walnut Hall Cup was run over a distance of one mile.

== Locations ==
- 1897–2000s: The Red Mile, Lexington, Kentucky, U.S.

== Records ==
Most wins by a driver

- 6 – Stanley Dancer (1959, 1966, 1968, 1971, 1974, 1976)

== Walnut Hall Cup winners ==
Year	Winner	Driver	Trainer	Owner	Time	Notes
1897	The Monk	Edward Geers	—	—	2:11 1/2	—
1898	Nico	Henry Titer	—	J. Malcolm Forbes	2:11 1/4	—
1899	Ellert	B. VanBokkelen	—	—	2:15	—
1900	Chain Shot	George West	Charles Laabs	Arthur Caton	2:15 1/2	—
1901	Captor	Charles Marvin	—	—	2:09 3/4	Stakes record
1902	Nutbearer	W. O. Foote	—	Joe E. Hubinger	2:09 3/4	—
1903	Billy Buck	Edward Geers	—	—	2:07 3/4	Stakes record
1904	Redwood	Jimmie Burns	Jimmie Burns	W. J. Bennet	2:09 3/4	—
1905	Turley	Edward Geers	Edward Geers	M. N. McFarland	2:07 1/4	Stakes record
1906	Nutboy	M. E. McHenry	—	J. A. Crabtree & Lotta Crabtree	2:11 3/4	—
1907	Jack Leyburn	Edward Geers	—	Edward & Joseph Medden	2:08 1/2	—
1908	Uhlan	Robert "Bob" Proctor	—	Charles Sanders	2:07 1/2	—
1909	Penisa Maid	M. D. Shutt	M. D. Shutt	M. D. Shutt	2:13 3/4	—
1910	Joan	Michael McDevitt	—	Capt. David Shaw	2:04 3/4	Stakes record
1911	R.T.C.	Thomas W. Murphy	—	Edward Thompson	2:08 3/4	—
1912	Dorsch Medium	Edward Geers	—	—	2:07 1/2	—
1913	Fan Patch	W. L. Snow	—	S. J. Housel	2:08	—
1914	Rythmell	Bert Shank	Bert Shank	Henry H. Stambaugh	2:04 1/2	Stakes record
1915	Peter Scott	Thomas W. Murphy	Thomas W. Murphy	—	2:05 3/4	—
1916	Mabel Trask	Walter R. Cox	—	—	2:07 1/2	—
1917	Early Dreams	Alonzo 'Lon' McDonald	—	—	2:04 1/4	Stakes record
1918	Ante Guy	Thomas W. Murphy	—	Ottinger Brothers	2:03 1/2	Stakes record
1919	Baron Cegantle	Alonzo 'Lon' McDonald	—	—	2:05 1/2	—
1920	Bonnie Del	Thomas Hinds	Thomas Hinds	Thomas Hinds	2:04 3/4	—
1921	Jeanette Rankin	Alonzo 'Lon' McDonald	—	Walnut Hall Farm	2:04 1/2	—
1922	The Great Volo	Walter R. Cox	—	Sanford Small	2:03 1/2	—
1923	Favonian	Ben White	Fred Edman	Fred Edman	2:03 1/4	—
1924	Tilly Brooke	Thomas W. Murphy	—	—	2:01 3/4	Stakes record
1925	Crawford	Thomas W. Murphy	—	—	2:04 1/4	—
1926	Guy Ozark	William K. Dickerson	William K. Dickerson	E. Roland Harriman	2:05	—
1927	Hazelton	Walter R. Cox	—	—	2:03 3/4	—
1928	Dewey McKinney	Walter R. Cox	—	Claude Luddington	2:02 1/2	—
1929	Gaylworthy	H. H. Stokes	—	W. N. Reynolds	2:05 1/2	—
1930	Hollyrood Chief	Will Leese	—	Frank E. Piper	2:01	Stakes record
1931	Allie Pluto	Charles Mabrey	—	H. E. Mabrey	2:01 1/2	—
1932	No races					
1933	Vansandt	Earl Pitman	—	Irwin W. Gleason	2:02 1/2	—
1934	Taffy Volo	Ben White	—	R. J. Reynolds	2:01 1/2	—
1935	Calumet Durham	Sep Palin	—	—	2:01 1/2	—
1936	Lee Hanover	Charley Lacey	Homer D. Biery	Biery Farm	2:01	—
1937	Guy Scotland	William C. Moore	William C. Moore	William C. Moore	2:01 3/4	—
1938	Havoline	Will Caton	—	Gibson D. White	2:02 1/4	—
1939	Senator V	Robert Vallery	—	L. E. Greer	2:01 3/4	—
1940	Spud Hanover	Harry Pownall	—	E. Roland Harriman	2:03	—
1941	Speed King	Harry Craig	—	A. F. Williams	2:02 1/2	—
1942	Volarion	J. F. Cartnal	—	L. E. Greer	2:03 1/2	—
1943	Morate	Fred Egan	—	Charles W. Phellis	2:04	—
1944	Love Song	Thomas S. Berry	—	Vic Holdaway	2:00	—
1945	Spartan Hanover	Franklin Safford	—	T. J. Sullivan	2:04 3/4	—
1946	Walter Spencer	Harry Pownall	—	Arden Homestead Stable	2:02 3/4	—
1947	Don Scott	Delvin Miller	—	W. N. Reynolds	2:02 2/5	—
1948	Chris Spencer	Harry Whitney	—	Dunbar W. Bostwick	2:00 2/5	—
1949	Moses	Dee Stover	—	Glenn Barker	2:03	—
1950	Pronto Don	Sep Palin	—	—	2:00 1/5	
1951	Miss Excellency	John F. Simpson Sr.	John F. Simpson Sr.	C. N. Myers & Lawrence B. Sheppard	2:04	—
1952	Yankee Hanover	Frank Ervin	—	Mrs. John L. Wehle	2:01	—
1953	Scotch Victor	Joe O'Brien	—	S. A. Camp Farms	2:02	—
1954	Jamie	Bob Parkinson	—	A. D. Knapp	1:59 2/5	—
1955	Deckwin	Wilbur Long	—	Austin Bros.	2:02 4/5	—
1956	Lady's First	Charlie King	—	—	—	—
1957	Empress Rodney	William McMillen	—	J. B. Carnes	2:04 4/5	—
1958	Fisherman	Richard Buxton	—	William M. Johnson	2:00 3/5	—
1959	Morgan Calhoun	Stanley Dancer	—	Donald E. Williams	2:00 4/5	—
1960	Demon Damsel	Delvin Miller	—	Robert & Henry Critchfield	—	—
1961	Hoot Frost	Joe O'Brien	—	—	—	—
1962	Behave	Ralph N. Baldwin	—	—	—	—
1963	Pack Hanover	Jimmy Hackett	—	Samuel Hutenbauer	2:00	—
1964	Dashing Rodney	Harold Dancer Sr.	—	Armour Stable	—	—
1965	Short Stop	Ralph N. Baldwin	Ned Bower	P. Huber Hanes Jr., John W. Hanes, & John Haskell	2:01	—
1966	Speedy Play	Stanley Dancer	—	Rose Hill Breeding Farm	—	—
1967	Garma Alert	Allan Walker	—	Gary Grisenthwaite	—	—
1968	Eric B.	Stanley Dancer	Stanley Dancer	Ernest B. Morris	2:03.1	—
1969	Noccalula	Sanders Russell	—	John Jackson	2:04 2/5	—
1970	Hoot Speed	Glen Garnsey	—	—	—	—
1971	Super Bowl	Stanley Dancer	—	Stanley Dancer & Rose Hild Farm	1:59 4/5	—
1972	Travelogue	Terry Holton	—	—	—	—
1973	My Super Pride	Del Cameron	—	—	2:07 3/5	—
1974	Bonefish	Stanley Dancer	Stanley Dancer	Mac Cuddy	—	—
1975	Tropical Storm	Ralph N. Baldwin	—	—	2:04.1	—
1976	Profit Sharing	Stanley Dancer	—	—	—	—
1977	Dark Eagle	Dick Richardson Jr.	—	Dunny Stable	2:00.1	—
1978	Legend Hanover	Joe O'Brien	—	—	1:59 3/5	—
1979	Rodney's Best	Hakan Wallner	—	Woodstock Stud	2:00	—
1980	Homesick	Billy Herman	—	—	2:01 1.5	—
1981	Sugar Move	Farrington	—	—	—	—
1982	T.V. Yankee	Tommy Haughton	—	—	1:56	World record
1983	Gentle Stroke	George Sholty	—	—	—	—
1984	Affable Crown	—	—	Em-Ar-El Stable	—	—
1985	Anniecrombie	Glen Garnsey	—	—	—	—
1986	—	—	—	—	—	—
1987	Grundys Cohnection	Jan Nordin	Joseph Kroll	Clifford Grundy, Seymour Grundy & Sidney Cohn	—	—
1988	—	—	—	—	—	—
1989	I'm Impeccable	Dave Rankin	Dave Rankin	Dave Rankin	—	—
1990	Grundy's Mint	Jan Nordin	—	—	1:57 1/5	—
1991	Royal Strength	R. Oldfield	—	—	1:58	—
1992	Dash Drive	Ron Waples	Doug Miller	Doug Miller, Dale Kistler, Doug Kistler, & Margaret Kistler	—	—
1993	Incredible Abe	John Campbell	—	—	—	—
1994	King Pine	Michel Lachance	—	—	2:00 1/5	—
1995	Kramer Boy	John Campbell	—	AB Dica Vinn & Alan Ritchie	1:57 2/5	—
1996	Meadowbranch Lucky	—	—	Hans Enggren	—	—
1997	Buzzin Brian	—	—	—	1:57 4/5	—
1998	CR Commando	—	—	—	1:56.1	—
1999	Fast Photo	—	—	—	1:58	—
2000	Chasing Tail	John Campbell	—	—	1:57 1/5	—
2001	Charlie Kronos	Chris Christoforou	—	—	—	—
2002	Broadway Hall	John Campbell	—	—	1:59	—
2003	Cantab Hall	Michel Lachance	—	—	—	Tom Ridge disqualified
2004	Ken Warkentin	David Miller	—	Christina Takter, John Fielding, Tie Domi, and Windsor Stable	1:55 3/5	—
2005	Make You Mine	Michel Lachance	Ron Gurfein	—	1:57 2/5	—
