= Parshall =

Parshall may refer to:

== Places in the United States ==
- Parshall, Colorado
- Parshall, North Dakota
- Parshall Township, North Dakota

== People ==
- George Parshall, organometallic chemist from DuPont Central Research
- Horace Field Parshall, electrical engineer
- Hugh M. Parshall, American harness racing driver and veterinarian
- Karen Parshall, professor and historian of mathematics
- Ralph L. Parshall, U.S. Bureau of Reclamation, developer of the Parshall flume
