= The Oaklands =

- U.S. National Register of Historic Places
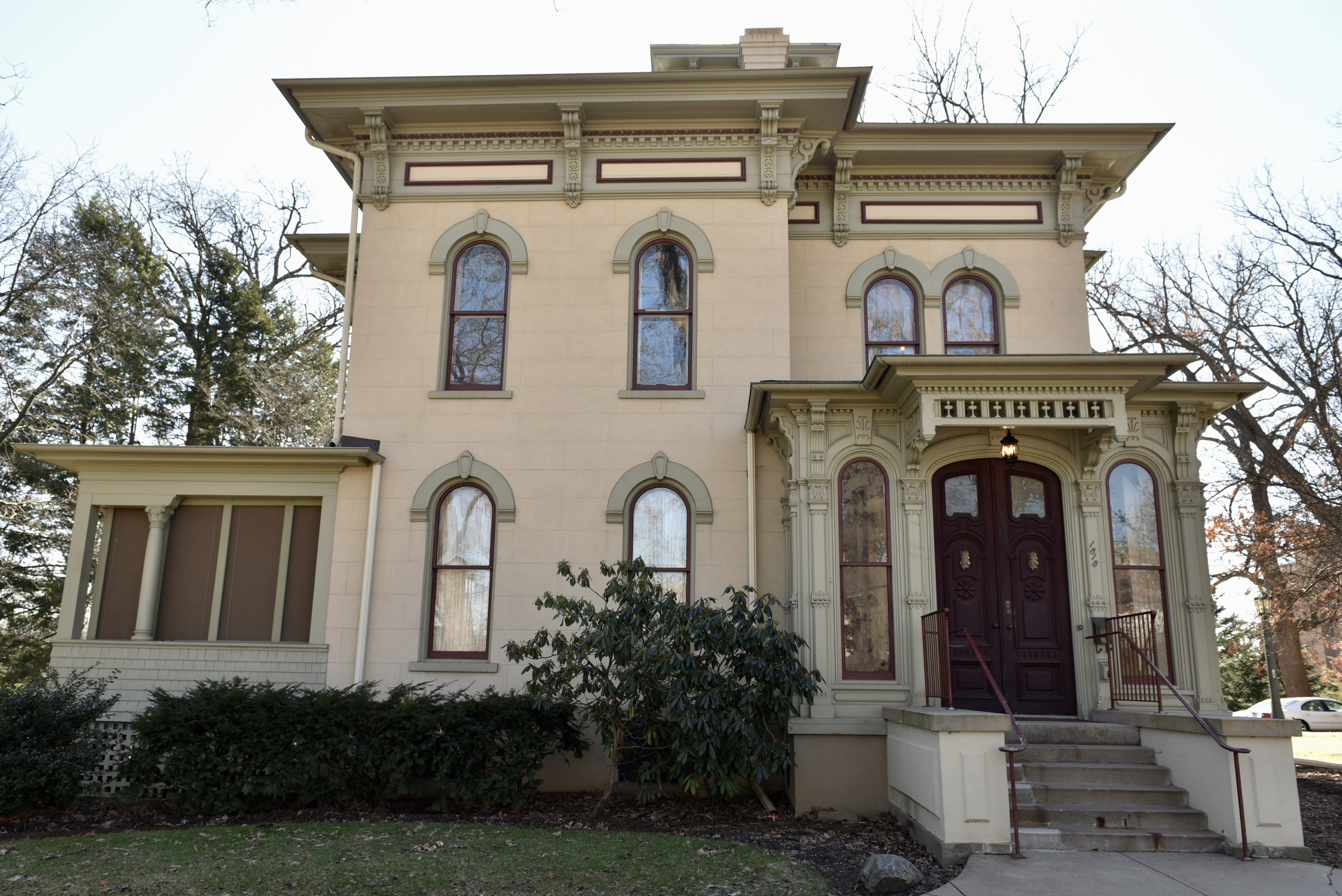

- Location within Michigan Location within the United States
- Interactive map showing The Oaklands’ location
- Location: 1815 W. Michigan Ave., Kalamazoo, Michigan
- Coordinates: 42°17′01″N 85°36′41″W
- Area: less than one acre
- Built: 1869
- Architectural style: Italianate
- MPS: Kalamazoo MRA
- NRHP reference No.: 83000865
- Added to NRHP: May 27, 1983

The Oaklands is a bed and breakfast owned by Western Michigan University, located at 1815 West Michigan Avenue in Kalamazoo, Michigan. It was listed on the National Register of Historic Places in 1983.

== History ==
Robert S. Babcock came to Kalamazoo in 1850 and opened a dry goods store. He prospered, and in 1869 he left to head the new First National Bank. At the same time, Babcock had this home constructed, finishing in 1870. Babcock named it "The Oaklands." However, the Panic of 1873 forced Babcock to sell his home. The Oaklands was vacant for a time, owned by E.R. Gard of Chicago. In 1876, the house caught fire, just before it was to be auctioned to satisfy a debt to local wagonmaker Benjamin Austin. Austin rebuilt the house and lived there through the 1880s. In 1893, he turned it over to his daughter, Amelia, and her husband Daniel Streeter.

Streeter had been a railroad builder, first in Wyoming and Colorado. He later built lines for the Chicago, Burlington and Quincy Railroad, the Denver and Rio Grande Western Railroad the Atchison, Topeka and Santa Fe Railway, the Chicago, Rock Island and Pacific Railroad, and the Chicago and North Western Transportation Company, among others. Streeter was also a horse breeder, and in 1895, on this property, Peter the Great was foaled. In 1898, Peter won the Kentucky Futurity, and he went on to become one of the greatest sires in trotting history. The Streeters lived in The Oaklands through Daniel Streeter's death in 1909 and into the 1910s. The family sold the house to Dr. Charles Boys in 1920.

Boys put in a golf course on the surrounding land, and the house was used as a clubhouse. In 1944, Western Michigan University acquired the property and constructed buildings around the house. The Oaklands served for many years as the residence of the university president, and later as the school's reception center. The house was refurbished in 1988, and was later made into a guest house and bed and breakfast.

== Description ==
The Oaklands Is a twenty-three-room, two-story Italianate house located in a grove of oak trees. The house is an irregular plan, made from stuccoed brick. It has a low hip roof with a belvedere in the center. The house has paneled brick chimney stacks, round-headed windows, and a projecting tripartite entrance with stylized Corinthian pilasters. Heavy brackets are under the eaves, along with a paneled frieze and dentils.
