= Ben White (harness racing) =

Canadian-born harness racing driver (1873–1958)

Personal information
- Nickname: B. F. White
- Born: Benjamin Franklin White; February 5, 1873 Whitevale, Ontario, Canada
- Died: May 20, 1958 (aged 85) Orlando, Florida, U.S.
- Occupations: Harness racing driver; horse trainer

Horse racing career
- Sport: Harness racing

Major racing wins
- Hambletonian Stakes (1933, 1936, 1942, 1943); Kentucky Futurity (1916, 1922, 1924, 1925, 1933, 1936, 1937); Championship Stallion Stake (1916, 1922, 1924, 1925, 1933, 1936, 1938); Matron Stake (1922, 1924, 1927, 1932, 1936, 1943); Horseman Futurity (1924, 1926); Transylvania Trot (1935, 1937); Horseman Stake (1942, 1945)

Honors
- United States Harness Racing Hall of Fame (1958); Canadian Horse Racing Hall of Fame (1977)

Significant horses
- Rosalind, Mary Reynolds, The Ambassador, Volo Song

Ben White (February 5, 1873 – May 20, 1958) was a Canadian-born harness racing driver and horse trainer who won the Hambletonian Stakes four times, including three consecutive victories from 1933 to 1936.

== Early life ==
Benjamin Franklin White was born on February 5, 1873, in Whitevale, Ontario, Canada.

== Career ==
White made his racing debut in Markham, Ontario, in 1888.

=== Village Farm ===
White became employed as a horse groom at Cicero J. Hamlin's Village Farm in East Aurora, New York, beginning in 1893. At Village Farm, he worked under head trainer Edward Geers, serving as his assistant. He took up the sport of harness racing as his career at 21 years old. He continued working at Village Farm until the operation closed in 1905.

=== Seymour Knox Stables ===
When Village Farm closed, he was engaged by Seymour H. Knox I to train a large portion of the string which Knox had purchased from C. J. Hamlin. As driver for the late S. H. Knox, he piloted several well-known horses of the Ideal Stock Farm, including the pacers Ess H. Kay and The Abbe, as well as Lord Oliver, Spring Maid, and Prince Ingomar. After Knox passed away in 1914, White opened his own public stable. He inherited five of Ideal Farm's leading campaigners from Knox's will. During the 1914 racing season, White's stable recorded the most successful campaign of his career.

=== Pastime Stable ===
White took over the driving duties for Billy Andrews of Pastime Stable during the summer of 1915 after Andrews was sidelined by illness. He campaigned the filly Volga for the Pastime Stable, and guided her to win the 1915 Kentucky Futurity for two-year-old trotters. Following his campaign with the filly, the Pastime syndicate engaged him for the upcoming 1916 season when Andrews was unable to return to his regular role. The East Aurora trainer officially signed a contract to train and drive for the Pastime Stable of Cleveland in November 1915. While with the Pastime Stable, he wintered in Thomasville, Georgia.

After taking over the training of the trotter Lee Axworthy, White drove him to a 1:58¼ mile in the following year, establishing a world record.

=== Public Stable ===
He later relocated to the state of Florida to reopen a public training stable. He established his winter training base in Orlando, Florida, in 1920. White debuted his string of Florida-trained colts on the racing circuit in 1922. Jane Revere led his juvenile campaign, while Lee Axworthy was his top three-year-old.

In 1923, he campaigned Mr. McElwyn on the northern racing circuit as a two-year-old. White piloted the W. H. McCourtle-owned colt to win the two-year-old division of the Kentucky Futurity in October 1923. Under his direction, the horse set world records as a two-year-old (2:04), three-year-old (1:59¾), and four-year-old (1:59½) trotter. A sub-two-minute mile by a three-year-old trotter was regarded as beyond reach until White took the horse to Lexington and recorded a time of 1:59¾. While Mr. McElwyn headed White's 1924 stable, it also featured the two-year-olds Sumatra, Aileen Guy, and Poppy. Aileen Guy returned the following season as his leading three-year-old campaigner.

White added Ruth M. Chenault to his stable in 1925 and conditioned her in Orlando over the winter. Under his training, she remained unbeaten in 10 starts during her two-year-old season in 1926. He drove Ruth M. Chenault to her 10th-successive victory in the $8,000 May Day Stake during the Grand Circuit meeting at Lexington on October 6, 1926. Later that day, he was involved in a racing wreck with Walter Cox while driving Poppy during the second heat of the Ashland Stake. He was knocked unconscious and taken to a hospital with an injured leg. White recorded his first victory following the accident on November 20, 1926, when he drove Hurry Up to a straight-heat win in the Geer's Memorial Stake. Following Ed Geers' death in 1925, White became regarded as the dean of the Grand Circuit drivers in the 1926 season. White was among the drivers in the first ever Hambletonian Stakes in 1926, placing third with Charm behind the winning Guy McKinney.

His stable produced two winners of major three-year-old fixtures in 1927, Iosola's Worthy and Kashmir. Kashmir won the Matron Stake and Championship Stallion Stake, while Iosola's Worthy captured the Review Futurity, the Kentucky Futurity, and the Hambletonian Stakes. Marvin Childs handled the driving assignment after White had already been engaged to drive Ruth M. Chenault.

==== Reynolds Stables ====
By the late 1920s, the horseman had become associated with William Neal Reynolds, a Winston-Salem tobacco magnate who purchased the Seminole Racing Club in Florida in 1928. He began training and racing the majority of Reynolds' horses. White also bred and sold successful young trotters, including the 2-year-old gelding Hoyle, which he sold to Reynolds in 1930.

White developed three leading two-year-olds in 1929 from Mr. McElwyn's first crop of foals, including Main McElwyn, Pola McElwyn, and Jessamine. Main McElwyn emerged as the standout, securing champion honors with a 2:02¼ mile at Lexington. By the end of the 1932 season, his public stable had become one of the largest and best-known in the United States. It included Mary Reynolds and Dick Reynolds, both owned by W. N. Reynolds, along with Spencer McElwyn, owned by W. H. L. McCourtie.

==== Hambletonian Stakes ====
White captured his first Hambletonian Stakes at age 60 in 1933. He piloted the W. N. Reynolds-owned filly Mary Reynolds to victory in the seventh renewal of the event. Years later, he drove Rosalind to victory in the 1936 Hambletonian Stakes. He bred the filly by Scotland-Alma Lee and gave her to his critically ill son, Gibson, as a yearling. The champion mare captured the race's 11th renewal, making White the first reinsman to win the Hambletonian twice. He captured his third Hambletonian Stakes win in 1942 at age 69, driving The Ambassador. More than 12,000 spectators attended the race at Good Time Park in Goshen, New York, where White drove the Bill Strang-owned colt to the title. White won another Hambletonian in 1943 with Volo Song, achieving back-to-back titles. The 1943 Hambletonian was the fourth he had won. At the time, no other driver had won more than twice. The 70-year-old took a winner's share of $23,263.92. His final, 19th appearance in the Hambletonian came in 1949. He drove William Wells.

== Death ==
Ben White died on May 20, 1958 in Orlando, Florida, United States, at 85 years old.

== Legacy ==
White became one of only three trainers to produce five Hambletonian Stakes winners, joining Billy Haughton and Stanley Dancer.

White's contributions to harness racing were recognized by his election to the Hall of Fame of the Trotter in 1958. His legacy was further honored with induction into the Canadian Horse Racing Hall of Fame in 1977.
