= Hudson River Driving Park =

Defunct race track and fairground in Poughkeepsie, New York

- Interactive map of Hudson River Driving Park
- Location: Poughkeepsie, New York, U.S.
- Coordinates: 41°40′57″N 73°54′25″W
- Owner: Jacob Ruppert
- Type: Trotting and auto racing track
- Surface: Dirt

Construction
- Opened: 1874
- Closed: 1923

The Hudson River Driving Park was a race track and fairground in Poughkeepsie, New York, United States. Established by the Hudson River Driving Park Association, it opened in 1874 with a one-mile track, grandstand, and exhibition hall. The grounds hosted harness racing, the Dutchess County Fair, bicycle races, and automobile races before closing in the early 1920s.

== History ==
=== Founding and early years ===
Interest in establishing a major agricultural and racing ground in Poughkeepsie, New York developed in the early 1870s. An organization initially proposed as the Hudson River Agricultural and Mechanical Association sought to create a large fairground and race track that could serve communities throughout the Hudson Valley. The original plans were abandoned, but the effort led to the organization of the Hudson River Agricultural and Driving Park Association. The Hudson River Driving Park originated with the Hudson River Agricultural and Driving Park Association, which was organized in 1874. The association was incorporated under New York law on March 26, 1874. George Ayrault was elected president, with John O. Whitehouse serving as first vice president. The organization included a number of prominent Poughkeepsie-area businessmen among its officers and directors. Ayrault, who presided over the association, was a prominent breeder of large cattle.

The association acquired land in southeastern Poughkeepsie, New York, on the south side of Hooker Avenue, between Cedar and Grand avenues. A capital of $75,000 was provided for the construction of a permanent driving park. The grounds covered approximately 40 acres and included a one-mile track. The mile track was originally built in 1847 by Morgan L. Mott, who at one time owned Independent, a son of Hambletonian 10.

Considerable work was required to prepare the property, including grading and construction of the track designed for trotting, grandstand and other facilities. The completed grounds opened in October 1874. Governor John A. Dix attended the opening, which also included a review of the New York National Guard and the first fair held by the new association. The inaugural racing meeting was held on July 4, 1875. Two meetings followed in 1876 and three in 1877, after which racing was suspended until 1882. Following the 1882 meeting, Poughkeepsie dropped out of the Grand Circuit, and the track closed in 1883. An August meeting was held in 1884, and after another interruption, racing resumed with meetings in June and September 1886.

=== Ruppert ownership ===
The Hudson River Driving Park passed through several managements before being purchased by Jacob L. Ruppert in 1887. Ruppert developed the property for horse breeding and racing. By the late 19th century, he was using the grounds as a stock farm and breeding trotting horses. David Harrington was appointed to manage the racing plant and stock farm. Virgo Hambletonian and Favorite Wilkes were installed as the farm's principal stallions. In 1889, two years after Ruppert's purchase of the property, Poughkeepsie was restored to the Grand Circuit. Following David Harrington's death, Horatio Nelson Bain joined Ruppert in staging race meetings at the park. Oakland Baron later succeeded Favorite Wilkes as the leading stallion at the stock farm, with W. W. Shult serving as manager. Guy Axworthy subsequently became the farm's principal stallion and sired Arion Guy, a four-year-old champion with a record of 1:59¾.

Under the ownership of Ruppert, the property also continued to accommodate public events. Beginning in 1888, the grounds were occasionally used for the Dutchess County Fair, which continued to appear there through 1918. The 1910 Dutchess County Fair attracted a particularly large crowd to the Hudson River Driving Park and featured an appearance by former president Theodore Roosevelt, an aerial demonstration by a Curtiss biplane, and an automobile speed exhibition.

In June 1915, Col. Jacob Ruppert Jr. became associated with the Hudson River Driving Park Association after succeeding his father, Jacob Ruppert Sr. as its president. Horatio N. Bain continued as secretary of the association. After several years without a Grand Circuit meeting, Ruppert offered the Hudson River Driving Park to New York horsemen free of charge for a proposed meeting during the week of August 28, 1916.

=== Horse and bicycle racing ===
Trotting was the park's principal sporting attraction during its early decades. Race meetings drew competitors and spectators from outside Poughkeepsie, and the Hudson River Railroad offered special fares for visitors attending major events. The grounds also became a venue for bicycle racing during the 1880s.

Automobile racing was another use of the grounds. The one-mile dirt track hosted automobile competitions in the early 20th century, including a 1905 race won by Barney Oldfield.

=== Closure and redevelopment ===
By 1922, plans to sell the grounds had prompted local discussion about preserving part of the property as public open space. The park remained in use after the 1922 racing season. Following the death of H. N. Bain, a series of subscription meetings was held at the track, although they attracted limited local support. The track closed on April 1, 1923. Horses from the Thomas W. Murphy stable were transferred to Syracuse, while local trainer Frank Phillips moved his stable to Goshen.

In June 1924, approximately 1,800 people attended a meeting of the Ku Klux Klan at the grounds, one of the last major recorded events held there.

Later in 1924, the property was sold for $200,000. The buyer was attorney Richard Arnold, who represented a local syndicate that planned to develop the 649-acre property for building purposes. A portion at the southern end was transferred to the city for use as a public park and eventually became Spratt Park. The remaining land was divided into residential lots, and houses were constructed on the former racing grounds.
