= Jim Dennis =

Personal information
- Nationality: American
- Born: May 9, 1923 Rexburg, Idaho
- Died: February 22, 2004 (aged 80) Solana Beach, California
- Occupations: Harness racing horse trainer and driver

Horse racing career
- Sport: Horse racing
- Career wins: 2,677

Major racing wins
- Review Futurity; American Trotting Classic

Racing awards
- Harness Racing Hall of Fame (2002)

Significant horses
- Adios Vic; Sir Dalrae

Jim Dennis (May 9, 1923 – February 22, 2004) was an American harness racing driver and trainer, inducted into the Harness Racing Hall of Fame in 2002.

Dennis was born in Rexburg, Idaho. His father and five Uncles drove Standardbreds. Dennis drove his first winning horse at age 13. Prior to his serving in the United States Air Force, Dennis considered a rodeo career.

One of the top horses Dennis drove was Sir Dalrae. Sir Dalrae, who had been bred to trot, was the 1973 Harness Racing Horse of the Year.

Dennis also drove Adios Vic. Adios Vic defeated Hall of Fame horse Bret Hanover four times. Dennis was a leading driver at Roosevelt and Yonkers Raceway plus Hollywood Park but also campaigned out of Chicago, Illinois from 1963 to 1971. By the time Dennis finished his harness racing career in 1991, he had won 2,677 races and the horses he had driven had earned 12.9 million dollars.

Dennis died at his Solana Beach, California home on February 22, 2004.
