= Walter R. Cox =

American harness racing driver (1868–1941)

Walter Cox
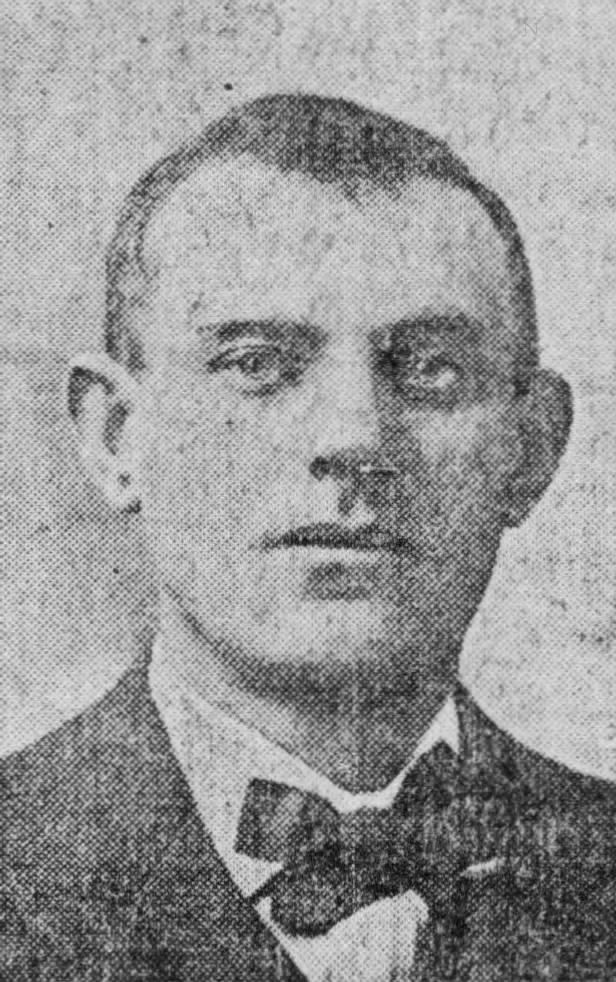
- Walter R. Cox, c. 1906

Personal information
- Nickname: Longshot
- Born: Walter Randall Cox; September 8, 1868 Epsom, New Hampshire, U.S.
- Died: December 15, 1941 (aged 73) Goshen, New York, U.S.
- Resting place: Pine Grove Cemetery
- Occupations: Harness racing driver; horse trainer

Horse racing career
- Sport: Harness racing

Major racing wins
- Walnut Hall Cup (1916, 1922, 1927, 1928); Matron Stake (1925, 1929); Kentucky Futurity (1920, 1923, 1927, 1929); Hambletonian Stakes (1929)

Honors
- United States Harness Racing Hall of Fame (1958)

Significant horses
- Walter Dear

Walter Cox (September 8, 1868 – December 15, 1941) was an American harness racing driver and horse trainer who won the 1929 Hambletonian Stakes with Walter Dear.

== Early life and education ==
Walter Randall Cox was born on September 8, 1868 in Epsom, New Hampshire, United States. The year after, he settled with his parents in Manchester, New Hampshire and went to the city's public schools.

He was the eldest son of Evelyn Mary (née Randall) and Charles Edson Cox. He was part of a distinguished New England family. His brother was Channing H. Cox who became Governor of Massachusetts in 1921. His other brothers were Louis S. Cox, a Massachusetts Superior Court judge, and Guy W. Cox, a Boston attorney.

His first experience with horses came at age six, and he later drove a delivery wagon for his father's Manchester butcher shop. He spent several years working in his father's business.

== Career ==
Cox took an interest in horse racing at 16, with storied horseman Edward Geers as his idol. A 16-year-old Walter won his first race with May Morning, collecting one-third of a $15 purse. He began training horses at age 18 after a brief apprenticeship as a stableboy and assistant.

The Cox stable was established in Manchester for several years, and later in Nashua, New Hampshire. At the turn of the century, he competed as a driver on the local New England circuit for two consecutive years before moving on to the Grand Circuit in 1903. By then, he operated a stable of 30 horses in Nashua. He secured a notable Grand Circuit win with Prince of Orange in 1903 at Empire City Race Track, earning $1,000. The win over "Pop" Geers immediately elevated his reputation from local prominence to national recognition. In September 1906, a collision at a Cincinnati Grand Circuit meeting left the New England driver with strained shoulder ligaments, ending his season. He returned to driving by December of that year.

=== Granite State Park ===
He began operating a public stable out of Dover, New Hampshire at 24. In 1907, he took over the lease of Granite State Park, a mile track in Dover, for his spring training grounds. His horses raced under the Christian Hill Stable banner, and he was assisted by Bert Yeaton.

In 1914, Cox sold Peter Scott for $30,000 to trainer-driver Thomas W. Murphy, under whom the trotter won 17 of 18 races the next year. He earned one of his most notable victories with A Game of Chance at North Randall, Ohio in 1918. He guided A Game of Chance to 2:03 1/4, lowering the 1911 pacing record set by Vernon McKinney.

He signed a contract with Stoughton A. Fletcher in February 1920 to oversee training operations at Laurel Hall Farm in Indiana, home of Peter the Great. He transferred his training operations from Granite State Park to Laurel Hill Farm. He was the leading reinsman on the 1920 Grand Circuit. The Laurel Hall driver won his first Charter Oak Stake with Grey Worthy (by Axworthy) at Charter Oak Park in September 1921.

=== Good Time Stable ===
At the end of 1921, he joined William H. Cane's Good Time Stable at Historic Track in Goshen, New York. During the 1922 season on the Grand Circuit, he earned $59,468 in prize money. He finished as the top money-winning driver, finishing slightly ahead of Thomas W. Murphy. He became involved in the management of Good Time Park alongside W. H. Cane. The Goshen mile track was used by Cox as a training course for the Good Time Stable before becoming a feature of the Orange County Grand Circuit program.

In the spring of 1927, he became trainer of Fireglow, owned by Vermont's William Bradford, with the goal of preparing the colt for the Hambletonian Stakes. Cox guided Fireglow to a world record of 2:04 during the 1927 Kentucky Futurity. At the North Randall Grand Circuit meeting on August 15, 1928, a second-heat accident blamed on Cox caused multiple injuries and led to the horse's disqualification and his 30-day suspension. Two days later, the colt was reported dead.

==== 1929 Hambletonian Stakes ====
After taking the 1929 Kentucky Futurity in straight heats with Walter Dear, he went on to win the Hambletonian Stakes in Lexington on October 8, 1929. Cox trained the first four finishers in the 1929 Hambletonian, with Walter Dear placing first, followed by stablemates Volomite, Sir Guy Mac, and Miss Woerner. He handled Walter Dear in each of the horse's winning races, earning $57,000 and finishing as the leading reinsman that year. Cox sold Walter Dear to Charlie Mills following the horse's three-year-old season.

By 1930, he had spent more than 45 years training and driving harness horses, remaining active as a driver in major races even at age 60. He gave up driving around that time and focused exclusively on training. In 1933, his staff included Harry Stokes, Ted Horan, and Bert Yeaton. The veteran trainer retired in 1938.

== Personal life ==
On June 19, 1889, he married Emma A. Putney (b. 1871) in Manchester. She became his wife of over 50 years and was later killed in an automobile accident in November 1939.

== Death ==
Walter Cox died on December 15, 1941, in Goshen, New York, United States, at 72. He was buried in a family lot at Manchester's Pine Grove Cemetery.

== Legacy ==
He was nicknamed "Long Shot" after repeatedly winning with horses that were overlooked by bettors and sold for minimal prices in auction pools.

Cox was part of harness racing's "Big Four," along with Pop Geers, Thomas W. Murphy, and Lon McDonald. He became the leading driver of the Grand Circuit when Murphy retired to become a horse trainer. He remains the only trainer ever to finish first through fourth in the money in a single Hambletonian Stakes race.

He was elected into the Hall of Fame of the Trotter in 1958. He was a 1963 inductee of the New England Harness Writers Hall of Fame.
