= Greyhound (horse) =

American Standardbred racehorse

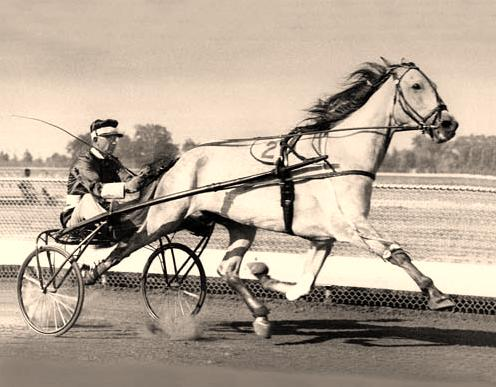
- Greyhound, World's Champion Trotter.
- Breed: Standardbred
- Sire: Guy Abbey
- Grandsire: Guy Axworthy
- Dam: Elizabeth
- Damsire: Peter The Great
- Sex: Gelding
- Foaled: 1932
- Died: 4 February 1965
- Country: USA
- Colour: Grey
- Breeder: Henry Knight
- Owner: Colonel E. J. Baker
- Trainer: Sep Palin
- Record: 82:71–5–2
- Earnings: $38,952

Major wins
- Hambletonian Stakes (1935); Championship Stallion Stake (1935); Horseman Futurity (1935)

Awards
- World Trotters Mile Record (three times); World Record at 1 1/2 miles World Record at 2 miles World record under saddle

Honors
- United States Harness Racing Hall of Fame (1965)
- Last updated on 23 January 2016

Greyhound was a grey Standardbred gelding by Guy Abbey out of Elizabeth by Peter the Great. Born in 1932, Greyhound was the outstanding trotting horse of his day and arguably the most outstanding in the history of the sport. He was nicknamed "The Great Grey Ghost" and "Silver-skinned Flyer." In 1935, he won the Hambletonian race and in 1938 he lowered the record time for trotting the mile to 1:55¼. This record stood until 1969.

== Early life ==
Greyhound was sold for $900 at auction due to his awkward appearance. As a two-year-old he won at venues including Good Time Park where he won the Good Time Stake, Springfield where he won the Review Futurity and Syracuse where he won the Horseman Futurity. At the end of the season he won the Lexington Trot at The Red Mile.

== 1935 season ==
In the Hambletonian, Greyhound sat back in the field until making a move at the 5/8 mile mark and swirling past the field to win in 2.02 1/4 in the first heat and 2.02 3/4 in the second. The first heat time was a race record. Reflective of the era, the nearly $19,000 he won at The Hambletonian was to become almost half his career earnings. After The Hambletonian Greyhound won the Review Futurity at Springfield with a 2.00 mile and the Championship Stallion Stake at Syracuse but due to injury he did not contest the Kentucky Futurity. He also won the Matron Stakes and Horseman Futurity. He won 18 of 20 starts as a three-year-old in 1935.

== 1936 and 1937 ==
In 1936 Greyhound won at Springfield in 1.57 1/4. It was the fastest mile ever trotted in a race and the fastest trotting mile since Peter Manning in 1922. During the year he won the Empire State Trot at Syracuse and the Transylvania at Lexington as well as Grand Circuit wins at Old Orchard Beach and Springfield, Illinois. He also trotted a mile in 2.02 at Allentown which was a half mile track world record.

In 1937 Greyhound began his season by smashing the half mile track record with a 1.59 3/4 mile at Goshen. In a time trial at Indianapolis he reduced the world record for 1 1/2 miles by almost 10 seconds to 3.02 1/2. At The Red Mile in Lexington Greyhound first equalled the world mark of 1.56 3/4 held by Peter Manning then a week later broke it trotting a mile in 1.56. His quarter mile fractions were 29 1/4, 57 1/2 and 1.27 1/2.

== 1938 season ==
In 1938 Greyhound raced more than he had the previous year winning the Trotting Derby at Goshen's Good Time Park, the Matron Stakes and the Championship Stallion Stakes. He won all 10 heats across the 5 races he contested during the year. He trotted in 1.56 3/4 over a slow track at Indianapolis on August 30 before returning to Lexington to try to break his record. At Lexington he first equalled his 1.56 world record then a week later going to the quarter in 29 1/4, half in 58 1/2 and three quarters in 1.26 he was home in 1.55 1/4, last half in 56 3/4. Five days later Palin tried a different tactic by going quicker to the half in 28 1/2 and 56 3/4, but again getting to the three quarters in 1.26, he finished in 1.55 1/2.

== 1939 and 1940 ==
In 1939 Greyhound did not start in a race as there was no horse prepared to race against him. Therefore, he was restricted to exhibitions against the clock. At Syracuse he was hitched together as a tandem with the mare Rosalind breaking the tandem record with a mile in 1:59. The next week at Indianapolis they did still better and nudged the trotting team mark down to 1:58 1/4. He took state records for Maine (1.57 1/2) at Old Orchard and Wisconsin (1.58) at Milwaukee. He also trotted 2 miles in 4.06 breaking the world record of Peter Manning.

It was announced in 1940 that Greyhound would be retired at the conclusion of the season's racing. He won seven races and 14 of 15 heats and at Lexington Frances Dodge Johnson rode him under saddle in 2.01 3/4 for a mile, a world record for a trotter under saddle. Greyhound was then retired. He won 71 of 82 heats and 33 of 37 races, with three of the four race defeats coming as a two-year-old in 1934. He had trotted 25 two-minute miles and at one time held fourteen world records.

== Retirement ==
He was retired in 1940 to Red Gate Farm in St. Charles, Illinois, and Baker's Acres in Northbrook, Illinois, and in 1949, moved to Flanery Farm in Maple Park, Illinois where Col. Baker had an air-conditioned stall built for Greyhound with a sitting room for guests. During his twenty-five years of retirement, Greyhound was immensely popular among horse enthusiasts around the country. Greyhound was so popular that visitors came to see him until February 1965 when he died at the age of 33. His guest book was signed by visitors from 30 countries and all 50 states. He was buried at the Baker horse cemetery on Red Gate Farm alongside 1943 Hambletonian winner Volo Song and Col. Baker's famous trotters Winnipeg and Labrador. In 2014, Greyhound's stall where he had been shown to the public before his death, was transported to the Harness Racing Museum & Hall of Fame in Goshen, New York so that it could be reassembled and displayed in the museum.

Greyhound was honored as Trotter of the Century by the Hall of Fame after his death. He was again voted Trotter of the Century when in 1999 Hoof Beats, the official journal of the United States Trotting Association bestowed a similar honor upon him.

== See also ==
- Harness racing
- Harness Racing Museum & Hall of Fame
- List of racehorses
