= Sep Palin =

Harness racing driver

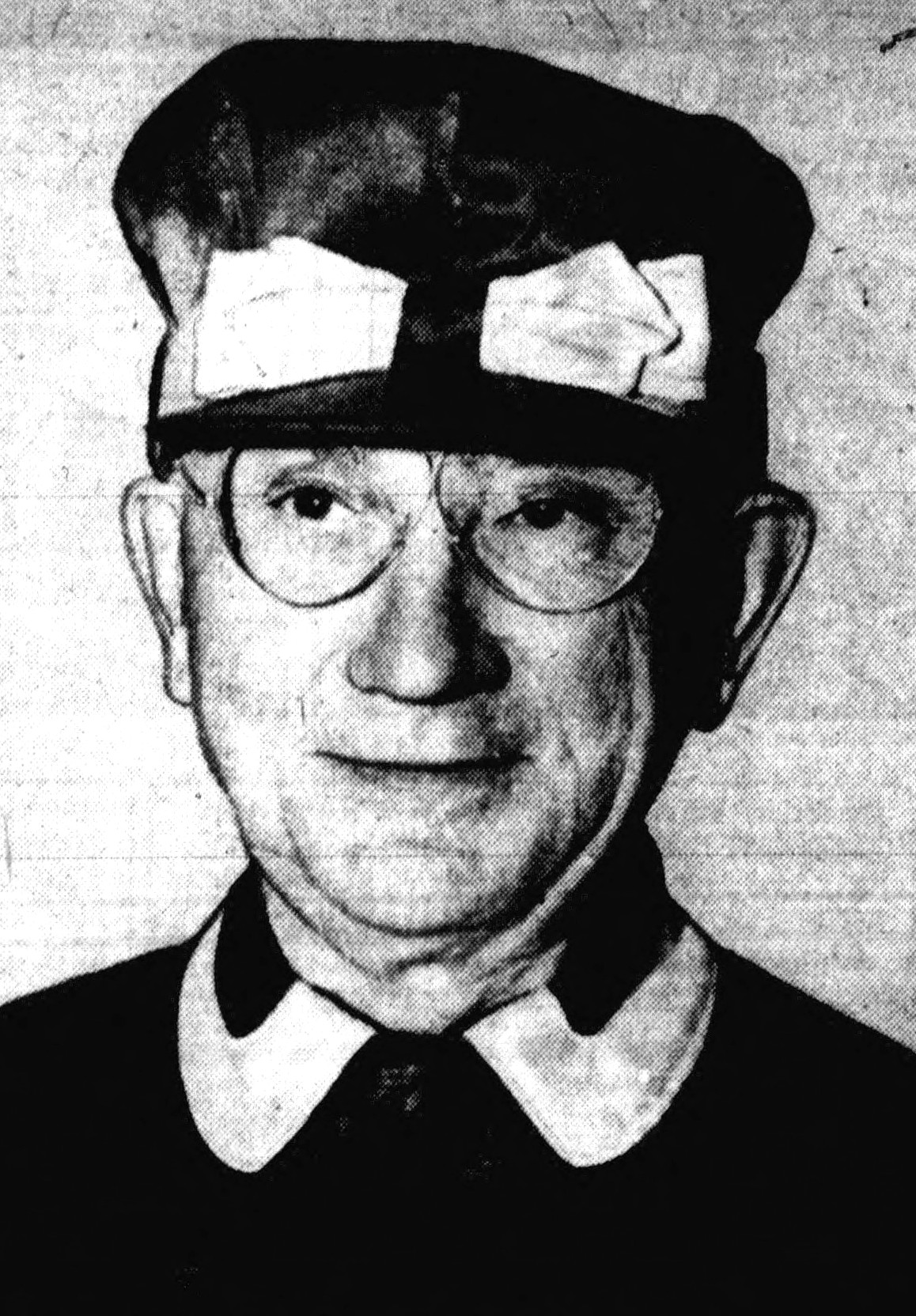
Palin, circa 1948

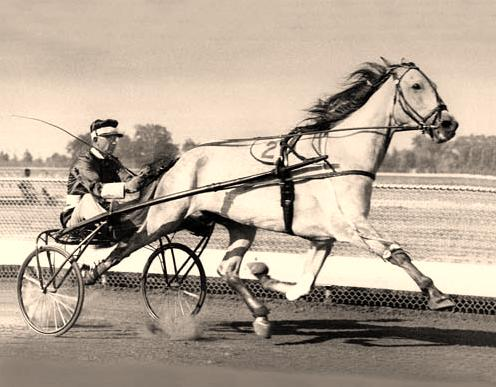
Sep Palin and Greyhound, c. 1938.

Septer "Sep" Faith Palin (April 11, 1878 – October 3, 1952) was a harness racing driver.

According to The Indianapolis News, "The first horse [Palin] drove was a big gray draft stallion which pulled the cart in which he made deliveries for his father’s butcher shop. That was after his family had moved to Russiaville, Ind."

Palin became interested in harness racing after attending the Tipton County Fair. At the age of 18, he went to work as a groom for Billy Marvin's stable in Attica, Indiana. He became a Grand Circuit driver only after a long apprenticeship with curry comb and saddle soap. The Grand Circuit is a group of harness racing stakes races run at various race tracks around the United States. He drove in his first race at Covington, Indiana, in 1900.

"In the summer of 1914 he came out with an unknown, but fast, pacer called Possibility, with which he won 14 straight races and purses totaling the then considerable sum of $11,000," The Indianapolis News reported. "More and more patrons flocked to his public stable, and the horses he drove for them included such good ones as Ora Direct, Logan Hedgewood, Saint Guy, Wanda May and San Guy."

By 1919, Palin and his string of horses were wintering in Indianapolis and he had already become well known in the harness racing world for his superior skills as a horseman. His skills as a trainer drew the attention of a few millionaires involved in harness racing, as exemplified by the so-called "Millionaire's Sweepstakes" at Seminola Park in 1926.

In 1932, Col. Edward J. Baker of St. Charles, Ill., bought Greyhound as a yearling, from Henry H. Knight, a General Motors official of Chicago and owner of Almahurst Farm near Lexington, Kentucky, at the Indianapolis trotting sales for just $900. At that time, Baker also provided the financial assistance necessary for the operation of The Senator Farm, while Palin, the stable's manager, did all the training and driving of the horses. Greyhound, also called the "Grey Ghost," Palin, and Baker went on to dominate the harness racing world during the latter half of the 1930s.

Palin and Greyhound won the 10th Hambletonian Stakes at Goshen, New York, in 1935. The Hambletonian Stakes is a major American harness race for three-year-old trotting horses, named in honor of Hambletonian 10, a foundation sire of the Standardbred horse breed.

Palin and Hoot Mon won the 1947 Hambletonian with a track record time of 2:00. The black colt went on to win the American Stake, the Du Quoin Stake, and the $36,905 Kentucky Futurity to wind up a career in which he earned $74,950.

While watching a time trial at the Lexington trotting track on September 29, 1952, Palin, 74, slumped from a rail position, fell, and hit his head on the ground. He was taken to the hospital, where he was in serious condition with a cerebral hemorrhage and a fractured skull. He died at the hospital on October 4.

The Harness Racing Museum & Hall of Fame elected Palin as an "Immortal" in 1958.
