= Victory Song (horse) =

American Standardbred racehorse

Victory Song (1944–1963) was a trotting horse who was bought as a yearling by Castleton Farm of Lexington, Kentucky. In 1947, he became the first Standardbred to be elected United States Harness Horse of the Year. In that year he ran the fastest mile in either standardbred gait setting a new race record of 1:57.3 for trotting the mile.

Retired to stud, Victory Song was an immediate success siring two world champions from his first crop of foals in 1950. Victory Song died in 1963.

He was buried at the Castleton Farm horse cemetery.

In 1966 he was elected to the Harness Racing Hall of Fame.

== Sire line tree ==
- Victory Song
  - Noble Victory
    - Noble Gesture
      - Mystic Park
        - Mack Lobell
    - ABC Freight
      - Garland Lobell
        - Conway Hall
          - Windsong's Legacy
        - Andover Hall
          - Donato Hanover
          - Nuncio
