= Peter the Great (horse) =

American Standardbred sire

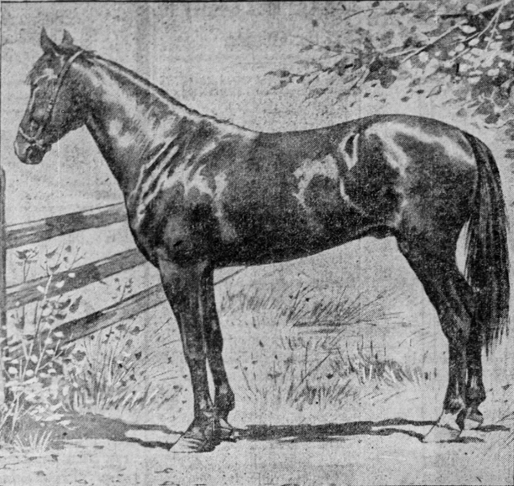
Peter the Great

Peter the Great (1895–1923) was an American Standardbred horse. A descendant of Hambletonian 10, he is considered one of the most important sires in the development of the modern Standardbred breed.

== History ==
Peter The Great 28955 structure chart notation pedigree

Peter the Great was bred by D. D. Streeter at The Oaklands, Kalamazoo, Michigan. At the age of two years he was trained by Peter V. Johnston. Stableman Jud Graine stated that Peter the Great was "Spirited and gentle as a kitten ... He was wise ... That is one reason his offspring were such great horses." Peter the Great did not have a name until the last hours before the Kentucky Futurity's posting time.

In 1898, Peter the Great was sold to J. Malcolm Forbes who was from near Boston, Massachusetts. Peter The Great was directly put into service on Forbes Farm in Massachusetts. Henry Titer trained him for racing. From 1901 and on, he was solely used at stud. Peter the Great entered the sale ring at Madison Square Garden, New York, in 1903. Peter Duryea (New York) and E. D. Stokes bought him. They sent him to serve on Patchen Wilkes Farm in Lexington, Kentucky. From 1908 Peter Duryea owned Peter the Great.

In 1916 he changed owners again, moving to Stoughton Fletcher and Tom Taggart, who lived in Indianapolis, Indiana. They placed him at Forkland Farm, Kentucky, for two seasons. Thereafter, he lived at Laurel Hall Farm, Indianapolis in a special barn. It looked like a summer cottage with a padded floor. He is buried at Tom Taggart's residence near French Lick, Indiana. In 1928, the ashes of his groom, Jacob Councilman, were spread on his grave.

In honor of Peter the Great, a monument was erected. In 1997 it was revitalized and later relocated to a wooded area near the West Baden Hotel, West Baden, Indiana. The inscription read: "By sheer merit he lifted his name to the head of all trotting progenitors. Death left him unrivaled by one of his own breed regardless of era, age, or breeding."

== Appearance ==
Peter the Great was 15.3 hands at the withers, 15.2 at the hips, and 16.1 hands long. His nose had a slight Roman tendency. His ears were wide at the base, the eyes large and full of expression. The neck was long, with somewhat upright shoulders. His croup was long, wide and well muscled. His color was chestnut. He had a white star on his forehead and on the left hind leg a white sock.

== Stud record ==
Peter the Great established the American Standardbred bloodline through the Hambletonian 10 offspring Happy Medium. During his life, Peter the Great covered thousands of mares.

His tail-male pedigree was Pilot Medium/Happy Medium/Hambletonian. His tail-female pedigree was Santos by Grand Sentinel/Swallow by Joe Hooker/Dixie by Sam Johnson's horse/Dam by Cumberland^{xx}.

Sire line descent tree
- Peter The Great
  - Peter Scott
    - Scotland
      - Spencer Scott
        - Rodney
          - Speedster
            - Speedy Scot
              - Speedy Crown
                - Speedy Somalli
                  - Baltic Speed
                    - Valley Victory
                      - Yankee Glide
                        - Glidemaster
                      - Muscles Yankee
                        - Deweycheatumnhowe
                        - Muscle Hill
                  - Beach Towel
                - Sir Taurus
          - Speedy Rodney
            - Green Speed
      - Hoot Mon
        - Scott Frost
  - Peter Volo
    - Volomite
      - King's Counsel
        - Solicitor
          - Overtrick
      - Worthy Boy
        - Star's Pride
          - Nevele Pride
      - Victory Song
        - Noble Victory
      - Poplar Byrd
        - Bye Bye Bird
          - Keystone Ore
        - Sampson Hanover
          - Sampson Direct
            - Direct Scooter
              - Matt's Scooter
      - Potomac Lad
        - Su Mac Lad
  - Peter The Brewer
  - The Laurel Hall
