= Edward Geers =

American harness racer (1851–1924)

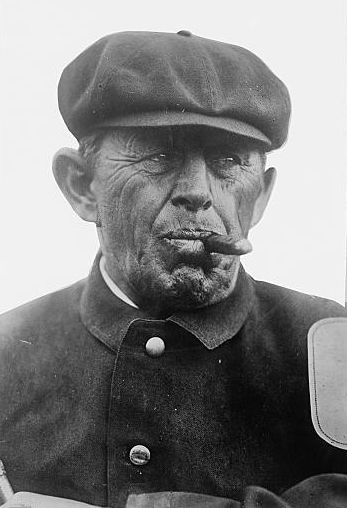

Personal information
- Nickname: Pop Geers
- Born: Edward Franklin Geers; January 25, 1851 Lebanon, Tennessee, U.S.
- Died: September 3, 1924 (aged 73) Wheeling, West Virginia, U.S.
- Occupation: Harness racing driver

Horse racing career
- Sport: Harness racing

Honors
- United States Harness Racing Hall of Fame (1958)

Edward Franklin Geers (January 25, 1851 – September 3, 1924), nicknamed "Pop", was an American harness racer and author of 'Ed Geers' experience with the Trotters and the Pacers.'

== Early life ==
He was born on January 25, 1851, in Tennessee to William Gideon Geers and Emily Woolard.

It was in Wilson County, Tennessee that Geers first discovered the passion for horses that would shape his entire life, developing his training and driving abilities from boyhood.

== Career ==
He took charge of training a string of horses at the age of 20. Geers recorded his first victory at the Wilson County Fair, driving Little Dave across the finish line in 3:04. Four years later, he laid further groundwork for his professional ascent, founding his own stable at the Swell Stock Farm owned by Major Brown in Spring Hill, Tennessee.

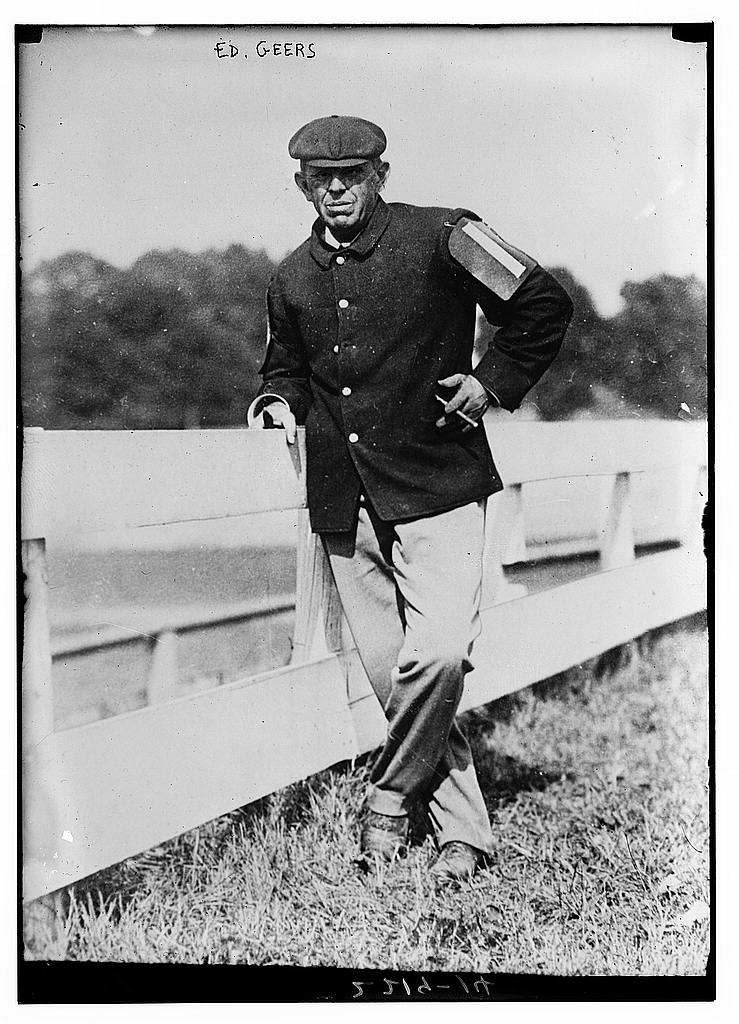
Geers, c. 1912

Geers settled in Nashville, Tennessee in 1873, and it was there that he developed the talents of Brown Hal, giving rise to the renowned Hal family. Following the closure of his Nashville training stables, he relocated in 1876 to the early fairgrounds in Columbia, Tennessee.

His introduction to New York racing came in 1877, when he competed at Fleetwood Park Racetrack.

Among the first to recognize the potential of the bicycle wheel, Geers embraced the innovation early. In 1892, he guided Nancy Hanks to a 2:04 mile in a then-revolutionary ball-bearing, pneumatic-tire, featherweight sulky that reshaped the sport of harness racing.

On August 18, 1916, Geers drove his first sub-two-minute mile, clocking 1:59 3/4 at Driving Park Racetrack.

== Death ==
E. F. Geers died on September 3, 1924, in Wheeling, West Virginia, United States. The veteran driver passed away from injuries suffered in a racing accident at the West Virginia State Fair. When his mare Miladi Guy fell, he was thrown from his seat, fractured his skull, and died while still unconscious. He was laid to rest in Rose Hill Cemetery.

== Legacy ==
Geers was honored in 1926 with the dedication of a memorial park in Columbia, Tennessee featuring a granite obelisk. Pop Geers Park originated as the first community park developed by the city.

His decades of competitive racing translated into nearly $2,000,000 in accumulated prize winnings. He was inducted into the United States Harness Racing Hall of Fame in 1958. In 2009, he was inducted into the Wilson County Agricultural Hall of Fame.
