= Harness Racing Museum & Hall of Fame =

Museum in Goshen, New York, US

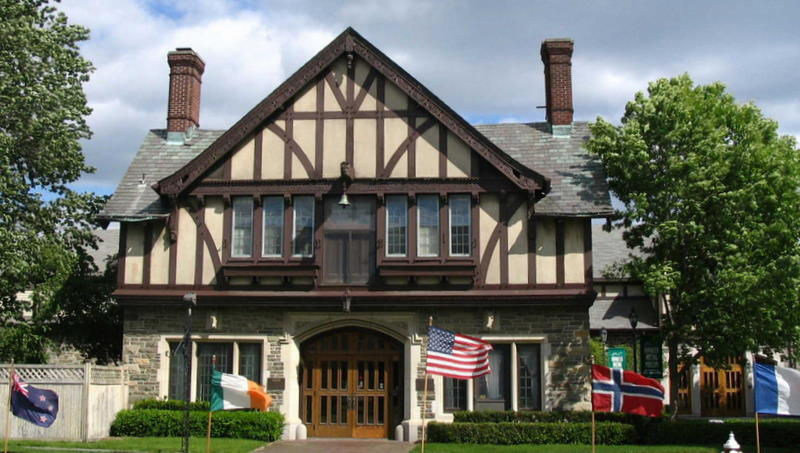
- Established: 1951
- Location: Goshen, New York
- Website: harnessmuseum.com

The Harness Racing Museum & Hall of Fame is a museum in Goshen, New York. The museum collects and preserves the history of harness racing and serves as a hall of fame for the American Standardbred horse.

Orange County is the birthplace of Hambletonian 10, the ancestor of all American Standardbred horses, and many of the early Hambletonian races were held in Goshen at the Good Time Park mile track. Established in 1838, the neighboring half-mile Historic Track is a National Historic Landmark, the oldest harness horse track still in use in the United States. Stables still operate on the grounds, and races are held annually. The museum opened in 1951, during Goshen's Hambletonian Stake era.

== Hall of Fame ==
The half-timber building that houses the museum was built as a stable in 1913. It houses artwork by famous equine artists and racing memorabilia dating back to the start of trotting. Exhibits include more than 1,700 paintings, lithographs and sculptures, 19,300 photographs, hundreds of drivers' uniforms, 75 sulkies, 59 sulkies, and seven carts, and a preserved stable, which serves as a walk-through display case for racing equipment. The museum also maintains a research library with more than 4,000 books and videos on the sport of harness racing. The Hall of Fame is contained within the museum.

The Hall of Fame inducts nominees under several categories, divided between those for horses and those for humans, including drivers, owners, and trainers. The three main categories are Living Persons, Living Horses, and Immortals. Winners from each category are inducted on Hall of Fame Day, the first Sunday of each July.

=== Living persons ===
Living people are nominated for the Hall of Fame annually by the United States Harness Writers Association, based upon their "ability, integrity, sportsmanship, character, and contribution to harness racing." All members with more than 10 years of membership are eligible to vote, and 75% support is needed for a nomination to pass. Winners receive a ring, and a statuette of each inductee is added to the Hall of Fame.

=== Living horses ===
The museum maintains a nomination committee which compiles a list of five nominees per year to be voted on by all museum members. All horses are required to have been drug-free during their careers and to have been retired from the sport for at least five years. A category for race horses, another for stallions, and another for broodmares have been established, each with its own criteria. Winners receive a plaque in the Hall of Fame, and a replica is presented to the current owner of each horse.

=== Immortals ===
Museum members in good standing nominate people and horses who are deceased more than 3 years. The nominations are reviewed by a committee, recommendations are made to the board of trustees, and the board elects the honorees. Inductees include horses such as Greyhound and Victory Song and drivers such as Del Cameron, Jim Dennis, Edward Geers, Gladys F. Harriman, and Gene Riegle. Inductees are trainers, owners, breeders, industry executives, artists, writers, and horses.

== See also ==
- Edward Geers
