= McKinley Kirk =

American businessman, horse breeder, and harness racing driver (1896–1978)

Personal information
- Born: April 28, 1896 New Holland, Ohio, U.S.
- Died: April 15, 1978 (aged 81) Washington Court House, Ohio, U.S.
- Occupations: Livestock dealer; horse breeder; harness racing driver

Horse racing career
- Sport: Harness racing
- Career winnings: $330,000

Major racing wins
- Horseman Futurity (1946); Abbedale Stake (1949); American Pacing Classic (1955)

Honors
- United States Harness Racing Hall of Fame (1997); Ohio Harness Racing Hall of Fame (1998)

Significant horses
- Belle Mahone

McKinley Kirk (April 28, 1896 – April 15, 1978) was an American farmer, businessman, horse breeder, and harness racing driver who was inducted into the United States Harness Racing Hall of Fame in 1997.

== Early life ==
McKinley Kirk was born on April 28, 1896, in New Holland, Ohio, United States.

== Career ==
=== Business career ===
McKinley Kirk was a farmer and businessman. In the late 1920s, he developed a 24-hour service business for motor vehicles. He opened the McKinley Kirk Service Station in Washington Court House on the corner of Court and Hinde Streets. He sold Sinclair products as well as tires, batteries, heaters, and automotive services.

During the summer of 1930, he bought a home in Atlanta, Ohio. After moving his family to Atlanta in 1931, he sold sheep and lambs before he began shipping hogs.

In the early 1930s, Kirk established himself as a horse breeder and played a key role in developing the Belle Mahone family. After observing the speed of Belle Mahone's foals, he set out to purchase the mare and as many of her daughters as he could locate. In 1933, he bought the brood mare from Ed Sever of Fayette County. He began breeding her offspring to top stallions, including the likes of Hal Dale in 1939.

=== Livestock business ===
He held weekly livestock sales and formed a partnership with auctioneer Walter O. Baumgardner. In September 1934, the company secured an agreement with the Clinton County Agricultural Society to lease the Wilmington art hall and fairgrounds for a livestock auction pavilion. Kirk was president of the newly formed Wilmington Livestock Sales Company, which conducted the sales. The first sale took place in the new pavilion at the Wilmington Fairgrounds on November 9, 1934. He became widely known throughout the United States because of his livestock purchases, often termed the "largest buyer of hogs in the state." He was in the livestock business in Washington Court House for six years before livestock dealers from Iowa purchased a part of his Fayette County hog business in September 1939. He had built up one of the largest livestock buying and shipping businesses in Ohio. He adopted a system of buying hogs and hauling them to the nearest purchasing station, handling thousands weekly and running large stock trucks throughout the state. When he sold his hog business, he kept his interests in the Wilmington Livestock Sales Company and the auction at Washington Court House. He shifted his focus to cattle, calves, and sheep.

=== Harness racing career ===
At 44, around 1939, he purchased his first standardbred racehorses. He sent several to trainer Clint Hodgins in Ontario, Canada, and others to Ernie Smith, a reinsman from Marion Township.

He entered the sport of harness racing in 1944 at the age of 48. That year, he began driving his own horses at the Ohio county fairs. On October 12, 1944, at the Union County Fair in Marysville, he filled in for Ernie Smith following an injury in the first heat while driving Valdo Abbe. Kirk borrowed Smith's jacket and climbed aboard the pacer. In the second heat of the two-year-old pace, he captured his first-ever heat as a driver.

Kirk operated a nursery and private training facility at his farm near New Holland, Ohio. It was located 1½ miles east of New Holland and 14 miles west of Circleville along State Route 22.

From 1945, he ran a harness racing stable at the farm, directing the breeding, raising, ownership, and training of his harness horses. He raced them at tracks in Ohio and across the eastern United States. Some of the horses were solely owned, while others were jointly owned. While Kirk handled the training and driving, Clarence Vallery acted as a silent partner. Kirk's private facility comprised a large stable, a half-mile training track, and other outbuildings.

He owned and drove many notable pacers. He drove Valdo Abbe to a first-place finish in three straight heats of the three-year-old pace at the 1945 Fayette County Fair. After Clarence Vallery died in the fall of 1945, 16 horses, including Valdo Abbe and Val Abbey, were sold to settle his estate. One of his top pacers, Honest Truth, was entered in the inaugural Little Brown Jug in September 1946. During 1946 season, he guided Honest Truth to win the Horseman Futurity for three-year-old pacers in Indianapolis, Indiana.

In 1948, he quartered his harness racing stable at Pickaway County Fairgrounds in Circleville. He stabled ten of his leading horses locally. Under the training of Colby Turner, his stable was led by Hodgen, a trotter-turned-pacer who was its most prominent horse at the time. Kirk drove the three-year-old pacing filly Waverly Ann to victory in the Abbedale Stake at Roosevelt Raceway in 1949. He was also part owner of Floating Dream with the Vallery brothers of Waverly, Ohio. In 1950, Floating Dream established two world records for two-year-olds. That year, the pacing filly was voted Ohio's Harness Horse of the Year by the Ohio branch of the United States Trotting Association.

==== United States Trotting Association ====
Kirk was elected to the United States Trotting Association's board of directors on January 8, 1952, succeeding Judge G. W. Rittenour. He served as the district director of Ohio. When he retired from his post on the board of directors, he had served eight consecutive three-year terms. Kirk also served as a director for the Little Brown Jug Society.

==== Grandview Oval ====
In late 1954, he joined Walter J. Michael and his sons and was appointed as vice president and general manager of the Grandview Oval harness racing track. After acquiring a sizable stake in the half-mile track, the group took control of the Grandview board of directors.

He bred Times Square, a notable pacer which was owned by his nephew Eddie Kirk. His nephew purchased the yearling which he had bred out of Pauline Abbe, a daughter of Belle Mahone, at a 1951 sale. Kirk trained Times Square and drove the horse in most of his races. On November 26, 1955, at Hollywood Park, he personally drove Times Square to win the $75,000 American Pacing Classic before a crowd of over 15,000.

By the early 1960s, he sold most of his horses not retained for breeding at general horse auctions such as Success Acres and Fasig-Tipton Old Glory Sales.

=== Banking career ===
He was elected to the board of directors of the First National Bank of New Holland in 1967.

== Death ==
McKinley Kirk died on April 15, 1978, in Washington Court House, Ohio, United States, at 81 years old.

== Legacy ==
Over the years, his horses accumulated hundreds of trophies and honors. He was responsible for breeding, raising, training, and racing four world champions: Floating Dream, Pleasant Surprise, Flaming Arrow, and Hodgen. Among his stock were four "Ohio Horse of the Year" winners: Floating Dream (1950), Timesquare (1955), Flaming Arrow (1956), and Great Pleasure (1961).

Hoof Beats Magazine, the official publication of the U.S. Trotting Association, called McKinley Kirk "the sport's most professional amateur" in a story published in January 1976.

New Holland dedicated a flag pole in the park to the memory of McKinley Kirk in 1982.

In 1997, he was elected into the United States Harness Racing Hall of Fame. He was inducted into the Immmortals category of the Ohio Harness Racing Hall of Fame in 1998.
