= Painesville Raceway =

Former harness racetrack in Ohio, U.S.

- Location: Painesville, Ohio, U.S.
- Owned by: Lake County Agricultural Society; Painesville Racing Association; Painesville Raceway, Inc.
- Date opened: 1934 (informally); 1948 (officially)
- Date closed: 1958
- Course type: Harness racing

Painesville Raceway was an American harness racing track located in Painesville, Ohio, in the United States.

== History ==
=== Early years ===
Painesville's early horse racing activities began at the Lake County Fairgrounds. The Lake County Agricultural Society, which conducted the Lake County Fair, held title to the lease of the track. Racing at the track at the fairgrounds ran from 1934 through 1958. The track was located along Route 20, roughly 2 miles west of Painesville, Ohio.

The Painesville Racing Association was incorporated in 1948, with retired Painesville businessman Walter S. Leach as president and C. M. Saunders, director of Fort Miami Raceway, serving as vice president. The association obtained a 10-year lease on the fairgrounds' half-mile track and spent $100,000 for the first meeting, installing new lighting, a parimutuel betting department, and renovating the grandstand. Former football star Sam Cordovano, formerly of Fort Miami Raceway, was appointed treasurer and general manager, while Horace J. Wilson served as secretary. Directors of the Painesville Racing Association were Leach, Saunders, Cordovano, George Bryce, and Earle F. Gongwer.

From September 20 to October 11, 1948, during its inaugural meeting, the track adopted the name Painesville Raceway. The operation helped revive trotting and pacing in northeastern Ohio.

In 1949, Painesville did not host any trotting or pacing events. Cordovano later disposed of his stock after conducting harness racing at the track in 1948 and 1950.

=== Painesville Raceway, Inc. ===
Painesville Raceway, Inc., an Ohio corporation, was formed in 1950 to conduct horse racing in Ohio. Cleveland's Byron D. Kuth headed the executive committee with Max Axelrod and E. F. Gongwer. Murray N. Goodrich of Painesville became president, C. M. Saunders and George E. Reed vice presidents, W. S. Leach treasurer, Lester W. Donaldson secretary, and Don H. Roberts, racing secretary for the 1951 program. In the summer of 1951, Goodrich and Kuth sponsored a 34-night schedule of trotting and pacing from June 19 to July 2. The Painesville Raceway season surpassed $1 million for the first time on July 14, 1951, with 10 nights remaining in the 34-night program. E. A. "Eddie" Miller was the track's General Manager.

The trotting and pacing track came under the control of a syndicate led by Saul Silberman and Ralph de Chiaro in January 1952. Mark H. Zettelmeyer was appointed president of Painesville Raceway Inc. During the summer of 1952, the new owners, Silberman and de Chiaro, renovated the track, building a clubhouse, dining room, and terrace, while adding 1,500 seats and expanding betting areas.

Painesville Raceway, Grandview Oval, and the newly opened Northfield Park comprised Northern Ohio's three district harness tracks in 1957.

In February 1957, a new syndicate took over Painesville Raceway, buying the operating lease from Saul Silberman. Walter J. Michael served as chairman, while Don H. Roberts, the new racing director, also held positions as racing secretary and assistant general manager at Grandview. The 44-night racing schedule under W. J. Michael and his associates began in May 1957.

Cleveland attorney Homer Marshman acquired W. J. Michael's stock in Painesville Raceway, Inc. in 1958, while Michael kept his shares in Grandview and Northfield. Marshman and his family held the controlling stock interest.

==== Northfield Park ====
After leaving the Lake County Fairgrounds in 1959, Painesville Raceway Inc. began leasing the facilities at Northfield Park. The racing dates were moved from Painesville to Northfield, Ohio. Marshman secured one of the track's 44-day racing permits, while Northfield's three harness racing permits were issued to Northfield Raceways Inc., Grandview Raceways Inc., and Painesville Raceway Inc. Painesville at Northfield drew its largest crowd of 14,085 on June 17, 1963, and produced its highest betting handle of $632,976 on April 1, 1978.

In June 1978, Painesville Raceway officials discussed returning the Painesville meetings to the local fairgrounds with the Lake County Fair Board. Marshman kept the option open with a yearly fee, while the rental agreement at Northfield Park would expire in 1982. Marshman paid the board $15,000 annually to retain his fairground racing rights. The Painesville-at-Northfield meeting was purchased for $700,000 by William "Bill" Snyder, who took control of all Northfield racing in 1981.

== See also ==
- Northfield Park
- Grandview Oval
- Ascot Park (Ohio race track)
