= Walter J. Michael =

American industrialist (1900–1977)

- Born: Walter J. Michael; December 6, 1900; Cleveland, Ohio, U.S.
- Died: January 20, 1977 (aged 76); Sun City, Arizona, U.S.
- Other name: Walter Michael Sr.
- Occupation: Industrialist
- Known for: Harness racing
- Honors: United States Harness Racing Hall of Fame (1968)

Walter J. Michael (December 6, 1900 – January 20, 1977) was an American industrialist, harness racing executive, and horse breeder who was the founder of Northfield Park. He was inducted into the Harness Racing Museum & Hall of Fame in 1968.

== Early life and education ==
Walter J. Michael was born on December 6, 1900, in Cleveland, Ohio, United States.

His mother was Sadie Dexheimer, and his father was Charles F. Michael, the founding president of Ohio Locomotive Crane Co. Walter spent his early years in Cleveland before relocating to Bucyrus, Ohio, in 1909. He graduated from Bucyrus High School and later attended Ohio State University.

== Career ==
=== Sozonian Vault Co. ===
W. J. Michael became the founding president of Sozonian Vault Co. in 1930, which was created to manufacture premium metal grave vaults and held the exclusive license to apply the bonderizing process. His company exhibited at the 1933 World's Fair.

In 1946, Michael, then in his 17th year as president, purchased the National Grave Vault Company of Galion, Ohio, and merged it with the Sozonia Vault Company, consolidating manufacturing at an expanded Bucyrus facility.

=== Ohio Locomotive Crane Co. ===
Walter took over as president of Ohio Locomotive Crane Co. in 1938, succeeding his father. Besides the company that his father established, he had become president of the Superior Equipment Co., the Crawford Steel Foundry Company, General Hydraulics Inc., and a director of the Bucyrus' Farmers and Citizens Bank by 1952.

=== Racing commissioner ===
His interest in harness racing started in 1937 with the purchase of a pair of standardbred horses. From that point, he raced trotters and pacers per year at the county fair and eventually at commercial parimutuel betting tracks. He became a director of the Hambletonian Society in 1943 and held the position until 1971.

During the 1940s, former Ohio Governor John Bricker appointed him to the Ohio State Racing Commission, and the appointment was later renewed by former Gov. Frank Lausche. Lausche also appointed him to the Ohio Board of Agriculture. Following World War II, he served as Superintendent of Speed at the Ohio State Fair and helped rebuild the track at the Ohio State Fairgrounds.

=== Pickwick Farms ===
He had placed two of his horses, Attorney and Eva's Boy, in stud under T. Wayne Smart at the Delaware County Fairgrounds racetrack before starting his own operation. In 1950, he started Pickwick Farms in Bucyrus, which became one of the top breeding farms in the United States. His father had previously operated Pickwick as a dairy farm. He had also been co-owner of Chuck and Walter Dairy Farm. He purchased Gene Abbe in June 1954 and sold him to the Ohio Crane Co. in 1962. By 1968, his stud farm held Gene Abbe, Irish, Circo, Attorney, Quick Pick, Easy Adios, Dudley Hanover, Darn Flashy, Baron Hanover, Tuxedo Hanover, and Spud Coaltown. The longtime owner relinquished his financial stake in Pickwick Farms in 1970 while maintaining control over its breeding operations. Over the course of his career, he claimed to have raised or owned at least 1,600 horses.

=== Harness racing executive ===
In December 1954, he headed a syndicate that purchased control of Grandview Oval harness racing track near Cleveland. After he bought an interest in Grandview, he secured an interest in Painesville Raceway in 1957.

==== Northfield Park ====
In 1957, Michael established Northfield Park, a half-mile track in Cleveland. After purchasing the grandstand from Aqueduct Racetrack in Queens, he moved it to Northfield, Ohio, where it was reassembled with the clubhouse at Northfield Park. The Northfield operator eventually merged two other tracks in northeastern Ohio. Grandview and Painesville later held their racing meets at Michael's Northfield Park. He sold the track and controlling interests in the Northfield and Grandview racing permits in 1972 for $7.5 million to Cleveland developer Carl Milstein and investors, including George Steinbrenner.

==== United States Trotting Association ====
He was elected a director of the United States Trotting Association, the governing body of harness racing, in 1954. In 1958, he was elected the 4th president of the United States Trotting Association, serving in the role until 1969.

During the late 1960s, he was serving as a director of the Little Brown Jug Society. In 1965, he helped Paul Hildrebrand establish the track at the Crawford County Fairgrounds and, with Grandview Raceway, donated lighting for the grounds. The two horsemen were honored in April 1968.

== Personal life ==
He had three sons: Walter R., James S., and Charles R. Michael.

== Death ==
W. J. Michael died from a heart attack on January 20, 1977, in Sun City, Arizona, United States, at 76. He was later buried at Oakwood Cemetery in Bucyrus, Ohio.

== Legacy ==
The United States Harness Writers Association (USHWA) awarded him its Proximity Achievement Award in 1957 and the Clem McCarthy Good Guy Award in 1965.

He was elected to the Living Hall of Fame of the Harness Racing Museum & Hall of Fame in 1966 and inducted in 1967. He received the Meritorious Award from the Ohio Chapter of USHWA in 1969 for his contributions to harness racing in Ohio.

The Scroggs House Museum holds a collection of bronze sculptures and andirons donated by Walter J. Michael.
