= T. Wayne Smart =

American harness racing driver (1904–1976)

T. Wayne "Curly" Smart
Personal information
- Nickname: Curly Smart
- Other names: Wayne Smart
- Born: Thurman Wayne Smart; 1904 Ostrander, Ohio, U.S.
- Died: November 14, 1976 (aged 71–72) Delaware, Ohio, U.S.
- Resting place: Oak Grove Cemetery
- Occupation: Harness racing driver
- Years active: 1922-1971

Horse racing career
- Sport: Harness racing
- Career wins: 1,873

Major racing wins
- Historic–Dickerson Cup (1940); Delaware Gazette (1943); E. H. Harriman Challenge Trophy (1943); Ohio Standardbred Futurity (1943); Geers Stake (1944); Horseman Futurity (1944); B.P.O.E. Stake (1947); Little Brown Jug (1946, 1952); Illinois Breeders' Futurity (1949); Transylvania Trot (1949); Ann Rutledge Stake (1950); Nassau Two-Mile Pace (1950); Old Oaken Bucket (1955, 1957)

Honors
- United States Harness Racing Hall of Fame (1970)

T. Wayne Smart (1904 – November 14, 1976), also known as Curly Smart, was an American harness racing driver and horse trainer who was a two-time winner of the Little Brown Jug and a 1970 inductee of the Harness Racing Museum & Hall of Fame.

== Early life ==
Born Thurman Wayne Smart, his birthplace was Ostrander, Ohio, in the United States.

== Career ==
Nicknamed Curly Smart, he began his driving career in 1922 at age 17, piloting one of his uncle's horses in a county fair race at Marion, Ohio. During the early "shortship" race, he drove a pacer owned by his uncle named Dan Logan. After taking his first win, he began to pursue the sport of harness racing. He quickly established himself as a driver-trainer of standardbred racehorses.

=== Little Brown Jug ===
His early reputation in the mid-1940s was tied to his work at the local fairgrounds in Delaware, Ohio, where he was the co-founder of the Little Brown Jug harness racing classic. Smart won the first-ever Little Brown Jug in 1946 with Ensign Hanover. He walked away with $35,358.25 on September 18, 1946, after competing in front of 27,000 spectators. His second win at the Little Brown Jug came with Meadow Rice in 1952 during the event's seventh annual edition.

==== Track superintendent ====
He was the track superintendent of Delaware County Fairgrounds racetrack and spent years transforming it into the world's fastest half-mile track. He became widely regarded for his knowledge of harness track maintenance and provided construction and maintenance consulting services across the country.

==== Smart Stable ====
He operated a private racing stable in central Ohio and served as the exclusive trainer for Joe Neville, the Little Brown Jug chairman, by the mid-1940s. During 1945, Neville's stable included a horse named Curly Smart after the harness driver and another named Delaware Gazette. He had a five-year stint as a trainer for the Neville stable.

=== Castleton Farm ===
During the 1950 season, he trained a number of Castleton horses. In November 1950, the Ohioan signed a contract to become a trainer at Castleton Farm, a breeding and racing operation in Lexington, Kentucky, for three seasons. The contract ensured that Smart would carry on as adviser to the Neville Stable. He was head trainer of the racing stable of Frederick L. Van Lennep, head of Castleton Farm, for 10 years. Castleton Farm of Lexington owned the horses under Smart's direction, and in 1954 Fred Bach came aboard as the stable's second trainer.

Smart handled champion pacer Gold Worthy, a son of Worthy Boy, who won the U.S. Invitational Pacing Championship and became track record holder at Grandview Oval in Solon, Ohio, in 1957. He drove the bay horse for its owner Dr. A. B. Thompson of Pulaski. His fastest mile, 1:56 3/5, came with Gold Worthy at the 1958 $75,000 American Pacing Classic, held at Hollywood Park Racetrack. He ranked 9th in the United States for the year 1958 after securing 92 wins.

In 1959, horses racing under the Smart Stable banner earned $250,000 in prize money. As one of the country's top trainers, he credited his stable's success to careful attention to shoeing and balance, selecting horses with properly set legs, and placing them in races where they had a realistic chance to win. Smart often raced and stabled horses at MGM Northfield Park. 12 of his 20 horses were held in Northfield during the summer of 1959. In March 1960, he managed his home base in Delaware, Ohio, while 26 of 36 Smart Stable horses underwent winter training at Pompano Park. In June 1962, the Smart stable included Smart Money, a bay son of Victory Song, and Emory Hanover, a colt owned by Dale Miller.

By early 1960, he had taken part in roughly 20,000–25,000 races over the course of his career, which began in 1922. He ranked first in winning percentage in five of the preceding six seasons.

He once served as the president of the Ohio Harness Horsemen's Association. In the mid-1960s, he was appointed as a director of United States Trotting Association's district one. He served on the USTA board of directors for a number of years. During this time, he was also serving as vice president of the Little Brown Jug Society.

At the close of 1966, he stood with 1,720 victories over 45 years and had been the leading percentage driver seven times from 1952 onward.

At Delaware County Fairgrounds in September 1970, Smart rode Smart Lobell (by Overtrick) to victories in both heats of the Ohio Standardbred No. 28, securing nearly $3,700.

In 1971, he had won all the major stake races at the Ohio State Fair and concluded a 50-year career in training and driving pacing and trotting horses. He finished his career with 1,873 victories and 45 2:00-mile drives between 1939 and 1972, according to the USTA.

== Death ==
Smart died on November 14, 1976, in Delaware, Ohio, at 72. He had been hospitalized after suffering from a stroke on November 5, 1976. He was buried in Delaware's Oak Grove Cemetery.

== Legacy ==
In 1958, he was awarded his first United States Harness Writers Association Paul Doumeng trophy, and again in 1959. It was given to Smart as to the country's leading percentage driver. In November 1963, the noted reinsman won the Paul Doumeng Trophy for the third time in its eight-year history. He led the country with a .493 rating. At 62, in November 1966, he was presented with the Good Guy Award and another Paul Doumeng trophy by the Harness Writers' group. Smart won the USHWA Proximity Award in 1968.

He was enshrined in the United States Harness Writers' Living Hall of Fame at the Harness Racing Museum & Hall of Fame in 1970. When the Ohio chapter of the Harness Writers Association established the Ohio Harness Racing Hall of Fame in 1978, he was posthumously inducted in 1979.

The city of Delaware honored him by naming a street Curly Smart Circle.
