= Old Oaken Bucket (horse race) =

Harness stakes race for 3-year-old trotters

- Location: Delaware, Ohio, U.S. (inaugural)
- Inaugurated: 1946
- Race type: Harness race for standardbred trotters

Race information
- Distance: 1 mile (1,609 metres or 8 furlongs)
- Surface: Dirt
- Track: Delaware County Fairgrounds racetrack (inaugural)
- Qualification: 3-year-olds

The Old Oaken Bucket is a harness racing event for three-year-old standardbred trotters. It was first raced at the Delaware County Fairgrounds racetrack in 1946.

== History ==
The Old Oaken Bucket was established in the mid-1940s at the Delaware County Fairgrounds racetrack in Delaware, Ohio. It served as a companion feature to the Little Brown Jug and was sponsored by the Little Brown Jug Society. While the Little Brown Jug is limited to three-year-old pacers, the Old Oaken Bucket was established as a consolation event for Jug nominees that later developed into trotters. The Old Oaken Bucket became a regular stakes event on the Grand Circuit card staged annually during the Delaware County Fair.

The Old Oaken Bucket for three-year-old trotting colts made its debut on September 20, 1946, with a purse of $6,000. The first race was won by Walter Spencer, driven by Harry Pownall on behalf of the Arden Homestead Stable of Goshen, New York. The Arden Homestead entrant swept both heats in a field of four starters, with Desira Hanover (Bion Shively) placing second and Twilla Hanover (Fred Egan) third, while Chestertown (Thomas S. Berry), winner of the 1946 Hambletonian Stakes, was fourth in each heat. The winner was timed in 2:07 and 2:06 3/4.

The filly division of the Old Oaken Bucket is called The Buckette.

== Locations ==
- 1946–present: Delaware County Fairgrounds racetrack, Delaware, Ohio, U.S.

== Records ==
Most wins by a driver

- 6 – John Campbell (1982, 1987, 1988, 1997, 2001, 2016)

== Old Oaken Bucket winners ==
Year	Winner	Driver	Trainer	Owner	Time	Notes
1946	Walter Spencer	Harry Pownall	—	Arden Homestead Stable	2:06 3/4	—
1947	Grand Parade	Harry Fitzpatrick	—	Baker Acres Stable	2:07.3	$6,250
1948	Rollo	Thomas S. Berry	—	Coldstream Stud	2:12.3	$6,250
1949	Bangaway	Ralph N. Baldwin	—	Saunders Mills, Inc.	2:06.0	$6,750
1950	Lusty Song	Delvin Miller	—	Hayes Fair Acres Stable	2:05.3	$6,000
1951	Mighty Fine	Benny Schue	—	Hayes Fair Acres Stable	2:06.1	$6,500
1952	Hit Song	Harry Pownall	—	Arden Homestead Stable & L. B. Sheppard	2:05.0	$6,250
1953	Elby Hanover	Harry Fitzpatrick	—	Saunders Mills, Inc.	2:09.1	$6,750
1954	Darn Safe	Benny Schue	—	Hayes Fair Acres Stable	2:08.2	$6,750
1955	Galophone	T. Wayne Smart	—	William T. Maybury	2:01.2	$6,000
1956	Elton Hanover	Joe O'Brien	—	A. C. Mudge	2:05.2	$7,000
1957	Philip Forst	T. Wayne Smart	—	Castleton Farms	2:06.0	$6,500
1958	La Belle	Richard Buxton	—	O. L. Mears	2:06.3	$6,250
1959	Rodney Pick	Benny Schue	—	Hayes Fair Acres Stable	2:06.3	$6,250
1960	Uncle Sam	Lou Huber, Jr.	—	K. D. Owens	2:05.0	$6,000
1961	Hoot Mite	Lou Huber, Jr.	—	Mrs. Samuel Huttenbauer	2:10.0	$5,500
1962	No races					
1963	No races					
1964	No races					
1965	No races					
1966	No races					
1967	No races					
1968	Snow Speed	Clint Hodgins	—	Castleton Farm	2:00.2	$19,520
1969	Crain Hanover	Harry Harvey	—	Ken Ross	2:06.0	$22,478
1970	Paris Air	Joe O'Brien	—	Garrett S. Claypool	2:02.2	$23,033
1971	Speedy Crown	Howard Beissinger	—	Crown Stable	1:59.2	$23,223
1972	Songcan	George Sholty	—	Nevele Acres & Don-Hy Stable	1:58.3	$20,404
1973	Macarthur	Howard Beissinger	—	Joseph T. Mendelson	2:03.0	$28,188
1974	Dream Of Glory	Pius Soehnlen	—	Leo A. Soehnlen	2:00.0	$31,715
1975	Skipper Walt	Roland Beaulieu	—	Mildred M. & George A. Smith, Jr.	2:02.3	$33,169
1976	Japa	William Herman	—	Charlotte Sheppard & John F. Simpson	2:02.4	$38,796
1977	Jurgy Hanover	John Simpson, Jr.	—	Kosmos Horse Breeders, Inc.	2:04.3	$33,412
1978	Cami Almahurst	Bruce Reigle	—	Mrs. Gene Reigle & Roger Black	1:59.1	$30,044
1979	Superior Sweep	Carl Allen	—	Loren W. Houston	2:06.4	$39,064
1980	Yankee Mama	Delvin Miller	—	Charles Keller (Lessee)	2:04.3	$39,714
1981	Tarry's Boy	William Herman	—	Crown Stable & Vegas Stable	2:07.4	$46,015
1982	Happy Crown	John Campbell	—	Torgils K B V Langemar	2:01.3	$43,596
1983	Tarport Frenzy	Jan Nordin	—	Stein Dalseng	2:02.3	$81,941
1984	Nevele Express	Jan Nordin	—	Osmo Kalevi Vuorinen	1:59.4	$65,150
1985	Master Willie	Jan Nordin	—	W. W. & Ann Allen	1:58.2	$81,132
1986	Everglade Hanover	John Simpson, Jr.	—	Castleton Farm, Hunt, Gaines & Simpson	1:57.4	$91,270
1987	Mack Lobell	John Campbell	—	One More Time Stable & Fair Winds Farm	1:57.4	$76,845
1988	Armbro Gold	John Campbell	—	Glendale Farms & Thomsa Eaton	1:58.2	$89,772
1989	Dr Guillotine	Chris Boring	—	Proudfoot Farms	1:57.4	$112,608
1990	Lender Hanover	Jan Nordin	—	Simon Bonnier & Bjorn Nordstand	2:02.3	$115,590
1991	Super Pleasure	William Gale	—	Robert J. Key & John Glesmann	1:59.0	$104,880
1992	Sierra Kosmos	Richard Beinhauer	Richard Beinhauer	R. Beinhauer & F. Beinhauer	1:56.3	$89,702
1993	American Winner	Ron Pierce	Milton Smith	Robert J. Key & John Glesmann	1:59.0	$72,260
1994	Call Toll Free	Peter Wrenn	Ivan Sugg	Ivan L. Sugg	1:57.0	$89,220
1995	Dr Fabe	Jack Moiseyev	Norman C. Jones	Fabian, Fabian & Stewart	2:01.1	$93,050
1996	CR Royal Mo	Carl Allen	Carl Allen	Carl & Rod Allen Stable	1:58.4	$85,920
1997	Meadowbranch Lou	John Campbell	Charles Sylvester	Sylvester, Guida, Donahue & Goldman	1:56.3	$103,560
1998	Rockaroundtheclock	Wally Hennessey	Osvaldo Formia	Lindy Farms of Conn	1:56.4	$113,779
1999	Keepitinthefamily	Michel Lachance	Osvaldo Formia	Lindy Racing, Gold, Adkins & Nigito	1:56.1	$130,419
2000	American Native	D. R. Ackerman	Doug J. Ackerman	Douglas Ackerman Stables	2:01.1	$68,215
2000	Credit Winner	Jim Meittinis	Per Ericksson	Manhattan Stables	1:58.3	$68,205
2001	Hard Rock N Roll	Ron Pierce	Brett Pelling	Al J. Libfeld	1:57.4	$66,670
2001	Liverman Hanover	John Campbell	Charles Sylvester	GDS Racing, Lindy Racing & Liverman	1:57.4	$66,670
2002	Chip Chip Hooray	Eric Ledford	Charles Sylvester	Sylvester, Prakas, Wingedfoot & Goldman	1:54.3	$122,310
2003	Mac's Crown K	David Miller	Charlie Norris	Robert J. Key	1:54.3	$111,670
2004	Coventry	D. R. Ackerman	Doug J. Ackerman	Douglas J. & Ada J. Ackerman	1:58.4	$61,410
2004	Make It Hot	Luc Ouellette	William Gallagher	Joseph P. Chnapko	1:55.3	$61,410
2005	Bare It All	Ron Pierce	Chris Beaver	Chris Beaver & David Lang	1:59.0	$106,190
2006	Limbo Glide	Ron Pierce	Jimmy Takter	Takter & Misty Trotting	1:56.1	$75,000
2006	Mystic Glide	J. Duke Sugg	Ivan Sugg	Ivan L. Sugg	1:56.0	$75,000
2007	New Hampshire Boy	Ray Schnittker	Ray Schnittker	Schnittker, Demeter & Burns III	1:57.1	$122,400
2008	The Budster	David Miller	Peter Foley	Oldford & Oldford	1:56.2	$75,560
2008	Dennis	David Miller	Roland Mallar	Slowey, Minute & Osterholt	1:53.3	$75,560
2009	Triumphant Caviar	Luc Ouellette	Chris Beaver	Beaver, Gallagher & Ouellette	1:54.2	$87,000
2009	Keystone Activator	George Brennan	Jim Raymer	Trillium Racing & Raymer	1:55.3	$87,000
2010	Flex The Muscle	David Miller	Ray Schnittker	Schnittker, Silva & Arden	1:54.4	$73,500
2010	Cassis	Ray Schnittker	Ray Schnittker	Schnittker, Kelk's, Arden & Silva	1:55.2	$73,500
2011	Celebrity Bombay	Brett Miller	Staffan Lind	Bender Sweden & Lind	1:55.2	$121,750
2012	Prayer Session	Dave Magee	Bobby Brower	DM Stables	1:54.0	$125,800
2013	Vibe Blue Chip	Yannick Gingras	Ron Burke	DiScala, Jr. & Massari	1:54.3	$65,750
2013	High Bridge	Yannick Gingras	Jimmy Takter	Takter, Fielding, McClelland & Fielding	1:55.1	$65,750
2014	Sumatra	Brian Sears	Tom Fanning	Joseph E. Smith	1:56.1	$118,300
2015	French Laundry	Yannick Gingras	Jimmy Takter	Takter, Fielding, Fielding & Katz	1:53.4	$126,000
2016	Blenheim	John Campbell	Per Henriksen	Steve Organ, Asa Farm & Thomas Nurmi	1:54.0	$122,500
2017	Shake It Off Lindy	Scott Zeron	Frank Antonacci	K R Breeding LLC	1:54.0	$105,125
2018	I'm Your Captain	Andy Miller	Julie Miller	Andy Miller Stable & Black Horse Farm	1:55.2	$111,075
2019	Osterc	Yannick Gingras	Per Engblom	Christina Takter & Goran Falk	1:54.4	$95,425
2020	Sans Defaut	Matt Kakaley	Ron Burke	Burke, Crawford, Silva-Purnel & Libby & et al	1:55.0	$83,800
2021	Sunny Crockett	Andy Miller	Julie Miller	Willow Oak Ranch & Andy Miller Stable	1:58.2	$87,700
2022	S I P	Joe Bongiorno	Ron Burke	Burke, Hatfield, Brixton Medical, & Weaver Bruscemi LLC	1:51.2	$88,600
2023	Herodotus	David Miller	Ron Burke	Burke Rcg, Hatfield Stbs, & Weaver Bruscemi LLC	1:53.1	$100,000
2024	Four Sixes	Yannick Gingras	Melissa Beckwith	William Hartt & Melissa Beckwith	1:54	—
2025	Cheers Hanover	Ronnie Wrenn Jr.	Ron Burke	Burke Racing Stable LLC., Weaver Bruscemi LLC, James Simpson and J&T Silva- Purnel & Libby	1:54 4/5	—
