= Harry Pownall =

American harness racing driver (1902–1979)

Personal information
- Born: Harry Eugene Pownall; 1902 Brooklyn, New York, U.S.
- Died: December 31, 1979 (aged 77) Honolulu, Hawaii, U.S.
- Occupation: Harness racing driver
- Years active: 1918-1970

Horse racing career
- Sport: Harness racing

Major racing wins
- Goldsmith Maid (1940); Walnut Hall Cup (1940, 1946); Coaching Club Trotting Oaks (1941, 1945); Delaware Gazette (1944, 1949); Hambletonian Stakes (1945); Championship Stallion Stake (1945, 1950); Historic-Dickerson Cup (1946); Greyhound Stake (1949); Transylvania Trot (1960); Dexter Cup (1961); Yonkers Trot (1967)

Honors
- United States Harness Racing Hall of Fame (1971)

Significant horses
- Florican; Star's Pride; Titan Hanover; Matastar

Harry Pownall (1902 – December 31, 1979) was an American harness racing driver and horse trainer.

== Early life and education ==
Harry Eugene Pownall was born in Brooklyn, New York, United States, in 1902.

His father was Eugene Pownall, the son of Samuel Pownall. Harry's father and grandfather both owned horses. Harry attended Commercial High School in Brooklyn. He quit school in 1918 to train and race trotters. When his father died in 1926, the family relocated to Mineola, New York on Old Country Road.

== Career ==
At age 16, he made his driving debut at Riverhead, New York, driving Billy Bunker for trainer Allie Cornwell.

He maintained a public stable for several years, keeping horses for David Dows, Dows' son-in-law Cornelius Bliss Jr., the Reynolds family, and the Robins family. At the time, he served as the secretary of the now-defunct Nassau Driving Club of Mineola. In September 1936, he drove all three winners at the Mineola Fair harness program: Mack Yerks, Hal Bee Laurel, and Joy Lincoln.

=== Arden Homestead Stable ===
The Brooklyn native went to work for E. Roland Harriman of Arden, New York. He became associated with Arden Homestead Stable of Goshen in 1937, first as assistant trainer to William K. Dickerson.

Pownall annually placed among the top drivers on the Grand Circuit. He placed second in Grand Circuit points in 1939 and third in 1940, a year when Arden Homestead was third in money won among stables. That year at Goshen, New York, he drove Florimel and won the third leg of the E. H. Harriman Cup. He also won the Walnut Hall Cup with Spud Hanover. He won the Coaching Club Trotting Oaks for three-year-old fillies in 1941 with Florimel and in 1945 with Beatrice Hanover.

He began training Titan Hanover in 1943. During the 1944 season, he notably campaigned the two-year-old to a world-record mile of 2:00, the first ever for the age group. He captured the 1944 Delaware Gazette, a two-year-old trot at the Delaware County Fairgrounds racetrack, with Titan Hanover. In 1945, Pownall guided Titan Hanover to a win in the Hambletonian Stakes at the DuQuoin State Fairgrounds Racetrack. At age 42, he was among the youngest reinsmen to receive the coveted prize.

Pownall was appointed as the head Arden Homestead trainer-driver in 1947, succeeding W. K. Dickerson.

With Star's Pride, he won his second Delaware Gazette in 1949, and in 1952 Pownall drove him to a 1:57 1/5 mile, setting a world record for trotters. In 1952, he drove Hit Song to victory in the Old Oaken Bucket for three-year-old colts in 2:05.

In the early 1960s, the veteran trainer guided Matastar, a son of Star's Pride, bred and owned by Arden Homestead. He drove Matastar to a world record time of 1:55 4/5 in October 1962 at The Red Mile in Lexington. The mile was the second-fastest ever recorded in harness racing, next to Greyhound's 1:55 4/5 in 1938. The record broke the previous record of 1:57 1/5 set by Matastar's sire, Star's Pride and Pownall in 1952. By 1962, he was the only trainer credited with four trotters achieving 1:58 or faster miles. Along with Matastar, they included Star's Pride (1:57 1/5), Florican (1:57 2/5), and Titan Hanover (1:58).

During the 1963 Hambletonian, Pownall drove Florican to a record-setting first-heat victory over Speedy Scot. The upset surprised the harness racing world and marked the stallion's first loss, though Florican failed to win the next two heats.

In 1967, he tied Tom Berry with his 22nd Hambletonian start, and by 1968, he was called the "dean of Hambletonian drivers" after surpassing Berry in total heats driven. 1969 marked his 50th anniversary in the sulky.

He was succeeded in 1970 by Ralph N. Baldwin as Arden Homestead Stable's head trainer-driver.

== Death ==
Pownall died on December 31, 1979, in Honolulu, Hawaii, United States, at 77 years old.
