= Transylvania Trot =

Harness stakes race for trotters

The Transylvania
- Location: Lexington, Kentucky, U.S. (inaugural)
- Inaugurated: 1889
- Race type: Harness race for standardbred trotters

Race information
- Distance: 1 mile (1,609 metres or 8 furlongs)
- Surface: Dirt
- Track: The Red Mile (inaugural)
- Qualification: 2:20 class (inaugural)

The Transylvania Trot was a prominent harness racing stakes event for standardbred trotters, first contested in 1889 at The Red Mile in Lexington, Kentucky.

== History ==
The Transylvania was established in 1889. It was operated under the auspices of the Kentucky Trotting Horse Breeders' Association and hosted at The Red Mile in Lexington, Kentucky. Racing secretary Edward A. Tipton developed the Transylvania as a race for older trotters with notable records, with the event taking its name from his former school, Transylvania College.

The first Transylvania winner was Jack, a grey gelding by Pilot Medium, driven by Budd Doble, a leading harness driver of the era. The inaugural race was won with the fastest heat timed at 2:15. Doble recorded back-to-back wins of the Transylvania Trot after driving McDoel to victory in 1890.

Transylvania candidates originally qualified based on their established time marks. Introduced as a 2:20 trot in 1889, the Transylvania dropped to 2:10 by 1902 and held that level through 1913. It then moved to 2:08 from 1913 to 1917, to 2:05 or faster until 1929, and was run as a free-for-all trot in the 1940s. The race became the premier aged stake in the United States.

During its early history, the Transylvania stake for trotters was the main attraction of the Kentucky Trotting Horse Breeders' Association's annual Grand Circuit meeting. A few years after the Transylvania was established in 1889, the Kentucky Futurity, one of harness racing's most coveted stakes events, was inaugurated in 1893. The Transylvania became the traditional prep race before the Kentucky Futurity. Horses targeting the Futurity title often raced in the Transylvania. By 1947, only four horses had won both the Transylvania and the Kentucky Futurity, including Victory Song, Boralma, Rose Scott, and Rosalind.

The Transylvania became one of the oldest continuously contested stakes. 1989 marked the 100th anniversary of the event.

== Locations ==
- 1889–present: The Red Mile, Lexington, Kentucky, U.S.

== Records ==
Most wins by a horse

- 4 – Pronto Don (1949, 1950, 1953, 1954)

Most wins by a driver

- 5 – Thomas W. Murphy (1911, 1915, 1923, 1924, 1925)

== Transylvania winners ==
Year	Winner	Driver	Trainer	Owner	Time	Notes
1889	Jack	Budd Doble	—	—	2:15	$5,000
1890	McDoel	Budd Doble	—	W. H. McDoel	2:15 1/2	$5,000
1891	Cheyenne	John H. Dickerson	—	—	2:15 3/4	$5,000
1892	Kremlin	Ed Bither	—	William Russel Allen	2:11 1/2	Stakes record; $5,000
1893	Harietta	Crit Davis	—	Parker Corning	2:09 3/4	$5,000
1894	Azote	Andrew McDowell	—	Monroe Salisbury	2:08 3/4	$5,000
1895	Bouncer	William J. Andrews	—	William Simpson	2:10 1/4	$5,000
1896	Senator A.	C. E. Alexander	—	Young & Butler	2:10	$5,000
1897	Rilma	W. O. Foote	W. O. Foote	W. O. Foote	2:08 1/4	$5,000
1898	John Nolan	W. O. Foote	—	N. W. Hubinger	2:07 3/4	Stakes record; $5,000
1899	Lord Vincent	Charles Doble	—	George Tod	2:08 1/2	$10,000
1900	Boralma	J. Y. Gatcomb	—	Thomas W. Lawson	2:08	$5,000
1901	Onward Silver	Edward Geers	—	J. L. Druien	2:09 3/4	$6,000
1902	Ozanam	Ed Benyon	—	Lamon V. Harkness (Walnut Hall Farm)	2:07 1/2	Stakes record; $6,000
1903	Caspian	Bert Shank	—	J. A. Andrews	2:09 1/2	$6,000
1904	Sweet Marie	Alta P. McDonald	—	W. G. Garland	2:04 1/2	$5,000
1905	Ethel's Pride	William J. Andrews	—	Dr. J. C. McCoy	2:06 3/4	—
1906	Nutboy	M. E. McHenry	—	Lotta Crabtree	2:07 1/4	—
1907	Sonoma Girl	M. E. McHenry	—	Lotta Crabtree	2:05 1/4	—
1908	Spanish Queen	Gus Macey	—	George Estabrook	2:09 1/4	$5,000
1909	Penisa Maid	M. D. Shutt	M. D. Shutt	M. D. Shutt	2:04 1/4	Stakes record
1910	Joan	Mike McDevitt	—	Capt. David Shaw	2:05 3/5	$5,025
1911	Charlie Mitchell	Thomas W. Murphy	—	—	2:07 1/4	$5,025
1912	Baden	A. S. Rodney	—	Louis Neidhardt	2:06 3/4	—
1913	Cheeney	John P. Fleming	—	John Mulkey	2:04 3/4	—
1914	Etawah	Edward Geers	—	F. G. Jones	2:03 1/2	Stakes record
1915	Peter Scott	Thomas W. Murphy	—	Henry Oliver	2:05 1/4	—
1916	Mabel Trask	Walter R. Cox	Walter R. Cox	Barton Pardee	2:03 1/4	—
1917	Ima Jay	Harvey D. Ernest	Harvey D. Ernest	Harvey D. Ernest	2:04 1/4	—
1918	Binland	Frank Hedrick	—	W. L. Snyder	2:03 3/4	—
1919	Prince Loree	H. McDevitt	—	Capt. David Shaw	2:03 1/4	—
1920	Peter Manning	Harry Stokes	—	Irving Gleason	2:02 1/4	—
1921	Greyworthy	Walter R. Cox	—	Sanford Small	2:03	—
1922	Peter the Brewer	Nat Ray	—	Ed Stout	2:02 1/2	—
1923	Rose Scott	Thomas W. Murphy	—	Henry Oliver	2:04 1/4	—
1924	Tilly Brooke	Thomas W. Murphy	—	John G. Elbs	2:01 1/4	—
1925	Etta Druien	Thomas W. Murphy	—	W. H. Hanan	2:02 1/2	—
1926	Guy Trogan	William K. Dickerson	—	E. Roland Harriman	2:04 1/4	—
1927	Kahla Dillon	Thomas S. Berry	—	Col. Jacob Lang	2:02 1/2	—
1928	Doane	C. Becker	—	L. S. Hadley	2:04	—
1929	Guy Ozark	William K. Dickerson	William K. Dickerson	E. Roland Harriman	2:02 1/2	—
1930	Hollyrood Chief	Will H. Leese	Will H. Leese	Frank E. Piper	2:05	—
1931	Worthywood	W. N. McMillen	—	—	2:04 1/4	—
1932	No races					
1933	Vansandt	Earl Pitman	—	Irvin W. Gleason	2:05	—
1933	Calumet Bush	Henry Thomas	—	W. H. Davis	2:06 3/4	—
1934	Prince Hall	Henry Thomas	—	Thomas Ashworth	2:00 1/4	—
1935	Taffy Volo	Ben White	—	R. J. Reynolds	2:01 1/4	—
1936	Greyhound	Sep Palin	—	Edward J. Baker	2:00	—
1937	Rosalind	Ben White	—	Gib White	1:59 1/4	—
1938	Boyne	Dunbar W. Bostwick	—	Dunbar W. Bostwick	2:00 3/4	—
1939	Spantell	Hugh M. Parshall	—	—	2:00 3/4	—
1940	Sister Mary	Sep Palin	—	Edward J. Baker	2:01 1/2	—
1941	Earl's Moody Guy	Vic Fleming	—	Walter J. Michael	2:01 3/4	—
1942	Nibble Hanover	Harry Whitney	—	Dunbar W. Bostwick	2:02 1/4	—
1943	His Excellency	Thomas S. Berry	—	W. F. Strang	2:01 1/4	—
1944	Blue Boy	Henry Thomas	—	Saunders Mills Stable	2:03	—
1945	Darnley	Harry Whitney	—	Aaron Williams	2:03 1/4	—
1946	The Colonel's Lady	Bion Shively	—	R. Horace Johnston	1:59 1/2	—
1947	Victory Song	Sep Palin	—	Castleton Farm	2:02 1/5	—
1948	Rodney	Bion Shively	—	R. Horace Johnston	2:01	—
1949	Pronto Don	T. Wayne Smart	—	Hayes Fair Acres Stables	2:01 3/5	—
1950	Pronto Don	Del Miller	—	Hayes Fair Acres Stables	2:00	—
1951	Pronto Don	Benny Schue	—	Hayes Fair Acres Stables	2:01 2/5	—
1952	Yankee Hanover	Frank Ervin	—	Mrs. John L. Wehle	—	—
1953	Pronto Don	Benny Schue	—	Hayes Fair Acres Stables	—	—
1954	Pronto Don	Benny Schue	—	Hayes Fair Acres Stables	—	—
1955	Kimberly Kid	Ned Bower	—	Allwood Stable	2:00	—
1956	Scott Frost	Joe O'Brien	Joe O'Brien	Saul Camp	—	—
1957	Galophone	Robert "Bob" Walker	—	William T. Maybury	2:00 4/5	—
1958	Egyptian Princess	Earle Avery	—	Clearview Stable	—	—
1959	Senator Frost	Ralph Buxton	—	Ray V. Foster & W. W. Galin—	—	—
1960	Sharpshooter	Harry Pownall	—	Arden Homestead Stable	—	—
1961	Senator Frost	Ralph Buxton	Eddie Wheeler	Ray V. Foster & Wayne W. Galin	2:00 3/5	—
1962	Uncle Sam	L. Huber Jr.	—	K. D. Owen	2:02 2/5	—
1963	Pack Hanover	Jimmy Hackett	—	Samuel Hutenbauer	2:02.1	—
1964	Lucy's Victory	Jimmy Hackett	—	Samuel Hutenbauer	—	—
1965	Governor Armbro	Joe O'Brien	—	Armstrong Bros. Co.	—	—
1966	Pay Dirt	Earle Avery	—	Clearview Stables	—	—
1967	Nevele Pride	Stanley Dancer	Stanley Dancer	Nevele Acres Farm	2:06 1/5	—
1968	Nevele Major	Stanley Dancer	—	Nevele Acres Farm	—	—
1969	Timothy T.	John F. Simpson Sr.	John F. Simpson Sr.	John F. Simpson Sr.	2:03 1/5	—
1970	Savoir	Jimmy Arthur	—	Allwood Stable	—	—
1971	Hoot Speed	Glen Garnsey	—	Castleton Farms	1:57 3/5	—
1972	Flower Child	Joe O'Brien	—	Samuel Huttenbauer Jr.	2:01 3/5	—
1973	—	—	—	—	—	—
1974	Colonial Charm	Glen Garnsey	—	Castleton Farms	1:56 1/5	—
1975	Colonial Charm	Glen Garnsey	—	Castleton Farms	—	—
1976	Zoot Suit	Stanley Dancer	Stanley Dancer	Norman Woolworth	2:03 3/5	—
1977	Speed In Action	Del Miller	—	H. A. Grant Jr. & Jean L. Malchin	2:00 1/5	—
1978	Doublemint	Peter Haughton	—	John Lavezzo	1:58 2/5	—
1979	Chiola Hanover	James Allen	Bill Vaughn	Mickey & Allan Chasanoff	1:58	—
1980	Final Score	Tommy Haughton	—	Hubert Reidel	1:56 4/5	—
1981	Graf Zepplin	Gary Lewis	Gary Lewis	Starship Stable	1:58	—
1982	Jazz Cosmos	Mickey McNichol	—	Sunbird Stable	—	—
1983	TV Yankee	Tommy Haughton	—	Leon & Lorraine Mahiz	1:56 2/5	—
1984	Impish Legacy	Pekka Korpi	Heikki Korpi	Heikki Korpi	—	—
1985	Nearly Perfect	Mickey McNichol	Joe Caraluzzi	Sunbird Stables	—	—
1986	Royal Prestige	Berndt Lindstedt	—	Continental Farm Stable	1:57 1/5	—
1987	Napoletano	Bill O'Donnell	Tommy Haughton	Walter Belanger	2:00 14	—
1988	Slybowl Hanover	D. Shetler	—	—	1:55 1/5	—
1989	Crown's Majesty	D. Rankin	—	—	1:56 2/5	—
1990	Embassy Lobell	Michel Lachance	Jerry Riordan	—	—	—
1991	Fiddler Hanover	John Simpson Jr.	—	Riccardo Tempestini	—	—
1992	Meadow Glory	Dan Ross	Dan Ross	M. Kenneth Bencic, Ron Hovorka, & Jim Di Fiore	1:54 3/5	—
1993	Pine Chip	John Campbell	Chuck Sylvester	Chuck Sylvester & Guida Stable	—	—
1994	Incredible Abe	John Campbell	—	Morris Feldman	1:54 1/5	Stakes record
1995	Giant Hit	John Patterson Jr.	—	Steve & Stan Robins/Ted & Jacqueline Gewertz	1:54 2/5	—
1996	Running Sea	Wally Hennessey	Chuck Sylvester	DDH Racing Stables Inc.	1:56.4	—
1997	Malabar Man	Jimmy Takter	Jimmy Takter	Malvern Burroughs	—	—
1998	Muscles Yankee	John Campbell	—	Irving Liverman & Perretti Farms	1:57	—
1999	—	—	—	—	—	—
2000	—	—	—	—	—	—
2001	Chasing Tail	John Campbell	Chuck Sylvester	Al Libfeld, Irving Liverman, Marvin Katz, and Sam Goldband	1:54.4	—
2002	Like A Prayer	Ron Pierce	—	—	1:55.0	—
2003	Mr. Muscleman	Ron Pierce	—	—	—	—
