= Roy Olcott =

American Standardbred racehorse

Roy Olcott is a race horse. He was foaled in 1999 in Illinois, United States.

He began training for a career as a pacing harness racehorse at the age of two. A severely injured ankle almost terminated his future before it began. After changing from trainer to trainer it became apparent that the injury would haunt him the rest of his life. This racehorse is called the Bobby Orr of harness racing. (Orr was an ice hockey player whose career was plagued by recurring leg injuries.)

While racing for 7 different trainers and 12 different drivers, Roy Olcott made it to the starting gate 156 times over 6 years, posting 31 wins, 19 seconds and 17 thirds (statistics provided by the United States Trotting Association, compiling numerous stakes class race victories during his career and set a personal speed record of 1:50 3/5 seconds pacing over the one mile distance.

During his career he was unable to qualify for the prestigious Little Brown Jug. He was beaten by two lengths by Red River Hanover during a qualification race.

Tom "Porky" Riccolo, the horse's former part owner, said of the horse's career:

"I've been around race horses for 20 years and bragging about it for 25. Roy Olcott has the biggest heart that I've ever seen in a race horse. There's not a horse on any racetrack that has the heart of Roy."

After his racing career Roy Olcott became a breeding stallion at the Norton Farms Stud Farm in Falmouth, Maine.

== Track record ==
- Winner of the elimination leg and final of the $48,000 Cardinal Pace Stakes races
- Winner of the elimination leg and the final of the Sportsmaster Pacing Series Stakes races
- Winner of the elimination leg and final of the Newcomer Stakes races
- Winner of the 3 year old colt stakes for Illinois bred horses
- Winner of the ISOBA Sale Bonus Stakes race
- Winner of an ISOBA Stakes for 3 year old colts
- 2nd place finish in The Hanover Stakes for 3 year old colts
- 2nd place finish in The Spring Champion Stakes race
- Winner of an open competition race for aged horses at 4 years of age

== See also ==
- List of racehorses
