= Thomas S. Berry =

English-born harness racing driver (1882–1962)

Personal information
- Nickname: Tom Berry
- Born: Thomas Sylvester Berry; 1882 London, England, U.K.
- Died: July 21, 1962 (aged 79–80) Lexington, Kentucky, U.S.
- Occupations: Harness racing driver; horse trainer

Horse racing career
- Sport: Harness racing

Major racing wins
- Transylvania Trot (1927, 1943); Hambletonian Stakes (1930, 1946); Kentucky Futurity (1930, 1953); Walnut Hall Cup (1944); Old Oaken Bucket (1948); Acorn Stake (1946); Arthur S. Tompkins Memorial (1939); B.P.O.E. Stake (1943); Castleton Farm Stake (1946); Championship Stallion Stake Trot (1930, 1943)<br[Championship Stallion Stake Pace (1932, 1945); Coaching Club Trotting Oaks (1947); Fox Stake Pace (1931, 1933, 1944, 1946); Geers Stake Three-Year-Old Pace (1942); Geers Stake Two-Year-Old Pace (1935, 1944); Goldsmith Maid (1942, 1944); E. H. Harriman Challenge Trophy (1936); Horseman Futurity Trot (1927, 1939); Horseman Futurity Pace (1933); Illinois Breeders' Futurity (1950); Little Pat Stake (1944, 1946); Matron Stake Trot (1930, 1946, 1947); Matron Stake Pace (1945); Maud S. Stake (1942, 1943); McMahon Memorial (1946); Nancy Hanks (1942, 1943); Ohio Standardbred Futurity (1944); Reading Fair Futurity Three-Year-Old Trot (1930, 1932, 1937, 1945); Reading Fair Futurity Three-Year-Old Pace (1932); Reading Fair Futurity Two-Year-Old Pace (1940); Reading Fair Futurity Two-Year-Old Trot (1935, 1938); Review Futurity Trot (1930, 1936, 1938, 1940); Review Futurity Pace (1945); Trotting Derby (1942); Village Farm Stake Two-Year-Old Pace (1935, 1943); Village Farm Stake Three-Year-Old Pace (1941, 1945)

Honors
- United States Harness Racing Hall of Fame (1964)

Significant horses
- Hanover's Bertha

Thomas S. Berry (1882 – July 21, 1962), commonly known as Tom Berry, was an English-born harness racing driver and horse trainer who won the Hambletonian Stakes in 1930 and 1946. He was inducted into the United States Harness Racing Hall of Fame in 1964.

== Early life ==
Thomas Sylvester Berry was in born in 1882 in London, England. His father was a British Army officer. After his mother's death in early childhood, he was placed in a boarding school at 9 years old as an orphan, supported by funds left by his father. He ran away three times.

After stowing away on a vessel headed for the United States, he arrived in Charlestown, Massachusetts and started working at a livery stable. He began as a horse groom, but his small frame led him quickly into work as a jockey for running horses. He started riding as a jockey when he was 12.

== Career ==
He shifted his attention to harness horses, seeking owners to drive for, and soon raced behind a high-wheeled sulky. At age 17, he drove in his first harness race at a fair in Lowell, Massachusetts, winning the 2:45 class event in 2:27. He built a reputation as a catch-driver, stepping in to drive horses for other drivers who had more than one horse in a race. He entered his first major competition in the American Trotting Derby at Readville, Boston.

=== Flemington Fair ===
In 1910, Berry was recruited to Flemington, New Jersey, by organizers of the Flemington Fair, who promised him a public stable to manage and race. That year, he began training for A. S. Case of Three Bridges, New Jersey, remaining at Flemington for 17 years. Over the years, he became well known at the Flemington Fair as his horses won numerous races. He competed in New England as well as Ohio, Pennsylvania, New York, and New Jersey.

=== Hanover Shoe Farms ===
By 1926, he had become one of the top trainers and drivers in the United States. That season, he drove all of Alonzo McDonald's horses including those of the Hanover Shoe Stables in the Orange County Circuit and frequently substituted for Thomas W. Murphy, one of the leading driver and trainers of harness racing horses. In September 1926, Berry signed a contract as head trainer and driver of Pennsylvania's Hanover Shoe Farms. He was at the head of the training department from 1926 to 1933. He also assisted John H. Dickerson, then the general manager of the stables and breeding establishment. He took over the training of Peter Manning in the spring of 1926 when he was sold to the Hanover Shoe Farms for $50,000. He drove Peter Manning to one of his world's trotting records at the Reading Fair on September 16, 1926.

During the first Hambletonian Stakes in 1926 at Syracuse, New York, he finished fifth. When Hanover Shoe Farms purchased Guy McKinney, the winner of the 1926 Hambletonian, Berry took charge of driving and training the trotter. His first horse to break 2:00 was Guy McKinney, which went 1:58 3/4 in 1927.

On August 15, 1928, he suffered a fractured leg in a collision involving three drivers at the North Randall track and was taken to a hospital in Cleveland, Ohio.

Berry made Seminole Park in Florida his winter training base, and during his first winter there he trained the trotting filly Hanover's Bertha. He developed Hanover's Bertha into a record-setting trotter, driving her to a world-record 2:02 mile for a two-year-old filly in 1929. In 1930, she captured the Matron Stake, Review Futurity, Championship Stallion Stake, Hambletonian Stakes, and the Kentucky Futurity.

=== Later career ===
He returned to operating a public stable in 1935 and led the Grand Circuit in victories that season. He went on to win the Review Futurity three more times with victories in 1936, 1938, and 1940. After ranking sixth in 1940, Berry became the leading heat-winning driver in 1941, recording 738 points. His Excellency gave him a string of major wins, including the Trotting Derby and Goldsmith Maid Aged Trot in 1942, repeat victories in the Maud S. Stake Aged Trot and Nancy Hanks Aged Trot in 1942 and 1943, and the 1943 Transylvania Trot.

He captured the Hambletonian Stakes for the second time in 1946 at Goshen, New York, driving Chestertown. He appeared in a record 22 Hambletonian Stakes and had purse-winning horses in 15 of them, another record. He made his final appearance in the Hambletonian in 1954.

In the early 1950s, he worked with Leonard J. Buck in developing the Allwood Stable while training and driving Kimberly Kid, the stable's first horse. His second win in the Kentucky Futurity came in 1953 when he drove Kimberly Kid to victory.

He drove until he was 79 years old.

== Personal life ==
He became a resident of Lexington, Kentucky in 1934.

== Death ==
Thomas Berry died on July 21, 1962, in Lexington, Kentucky, United States. He had suffered a stroke while visiting Scioto Downs in Columbus, Ohio, in connection with the sale of a horse and was admitted to the St. Joseph Hospital on July 4, 1962.

== Legacy ==
He was elected into the U.S. Harness Racing Hall of Fame in 1964.
