= MGM Growth Properties =

Real estate investment trust

MGM Growth Properties, LLC
- Founded: October 23, 2015; 11 years ago
- Defunct: April 29, 2022; 4 years ago
- Fate: Acquired by Vici Properties
- Successor: Vici Properties
- Headquarters: Summerlin South, Nevada, United States
- Revenue: ▲$881 million (2019)
- Net income: ▲$275 million (2019)
- Total assets: ▲$11.9 billion (2019)
- Total equity: ▲$6.9 billion (2019)

MGM Growth Properties, LLC (MGP) was a real estate investment trust (REIT) based in Summerlin South, Nevada, that invested in large-scale casino properties. The company had whole or majority ownership of 15 properties, all operated by MGM Resorts International, from which the REIT was spun out in 2015. Vici Properties leases the properties to MGM Resorts via triple-net leases, since the REIT was acquired by Vici — a 2017 REIT spin-off from Caesars Entertainment Corporation — in April 2022, for $17.2 billion.

== History ==
The company was formed on October 23, 2015.

On April 25, 2016, the company became a public company via an initial public offering and acquired The Mirage, Mandalay Bay, Luxor Las Vegas, New York-New York Hotel and Casino, Monte Carlo Resort and Casino, Excalibur Hotel and Casino, The Park, Gold Strike Tunica, MGM Grand Detroit, and Beau Rivage from MGM Resorts International.

On August 1, 2016, the company acquired the real estate assets related to the Borgata Hotel Casino and Spa from MGM.

In September 2017, the company acquired MGM National Harbor for $1.2 billion.

In January 2018, MGM Growth Properties offered to acquire the REIT Vici Properties. Vici Properties was spun off from Caesars Entertainment Operating Company (CEOC) after CEOC filed for Chapter 11 bankruptcy in January 2015, with the spin-off being completed on the 6th October 2017. MGM Growth Properties offered an estimated $5.9 billion for Vici Properties, however Vici Properties' board rejected the offer, deciding instead to proceed with a planned initial public offering. Vici completed its IPO on the New York Stock Exchange in February 2018, raising $1.2 billion. Four years later on the 29th April 2022, MGM Growth Properties would instead would be acquired by Vici Properties for $17.2 billion.

In July 2018, MGP bought Northfield Park, a racino in Ohio, for $1.02 billion. Hard Rock International remained as the property's manager. In January 2019, the company bought another racino, Yonkers Raceway & Empire City Casino, for $625 million, and leased it to MGM Resorts. In April 2019, MGM Resorts bought Northfield's operating business from MGM Growth for $275 million in stock, assumed control from Hard Rock, and rebranded the property as MGM Northfield Park. MGM Resorts leased the property from MGM Growth for initial rent of $60 million per year.

In February 2020, MGP formed a joint venture with the Blackstone Real Estate Income Trust to own the real estate of Mandalay Bay and MGM Grand Las Vegas. The joint venture paid $2.1 billion to MGP for Mandalay Bay, and $2.4 billion to MGM Resorts for the MGM Grand. MGP took 50.1 percent ownership of the joint venture.

In May 2021, MGP agreed to buy the real estate of MGM Springfield from MGM Resorts for $400 million. The property would be leased back to MGM Resorts for initial rent of $30 million per year.

In August 2021, MGP agreed to be acquired by Vici Properties for $17.2 billion (consisting of $4.4 billion of cash, $5.7 billion of assumed debt, and the remainder in stock). The sale was completed on April 29, 2022.

== Properties ==
The properties owned by MGM Growth Properties at the time of its acquisition were:

- Beau Rivage
- Borgata Hotel Casino and Spa
- Excalibur Hotel and Casino
- Gold Strike Tunica
- Luxor Las Vegas
- Mandalay Bay (50.1% stake)
- MGM Grand Detroit
- MGM Grand Las Vegas (50.1% stake)
- MGM National Harbor
- MGM Northfield Park
- MGM Springfield
- The Mirage
- New York-New York Hotel and Casino
- The Park
- Park MGM
- Yonkers Raceway & Empire City Casino
