= Grandview Oval =

Former horse racing course in Solon, Ohio

- Location: Solon, Ohio, U.S.
- Owned by: Aurora Downs Inc. (1952-1954); Grandview Raceway Inc. (1954-1958)
- Date opened: 1952
- Capacity: 15,000
- Course type: Harness racing

Grandview Oval, also known as Grandview Raceway, was an American harness racing track located in Solon, Ohio, near Cleveland, in the United States.

== History ==
=== Before the Grandview Oval ===
The original track before Grandview, established in 1928 for flat racing, went out of operation amid the Great Depression. Bainbridge Park, as it was originally named, was used for thoroughbred horses. Cleveland gambling figure Thomas Joseph McGinty had originally built the track.

=== Facility and operation ===
Grandview Oval was located in Solon, Ohio, on the outskirts of Cleveland. The site, in Cuyahoga County, was 15 miles southeast of Cleveland, located between Solon and Geauga Lake. Aurora Road was directly across from the track.

In 1952, a new harness racing venture was formed under the operation of Aurora Downs Inc. Jack H. Harris, a Cleveland sportsman and the oval's president, purchased an additional 175 acres for construction of a grandstand to accommodate 3,600 spectators. Sam Levy was appointed advisor to the track's president, Jack Harris, while Dick Case served as general manager. Dick Case, previously with Ocean Downs, had been appointed to a 12-month assignment in February 1952. Among the track's principal stockholders were American entertainers Bob Hope and Milton Berle.

Grandview had both a one-mile and a half-mile track. The racing plant, featuring a half-mile track on Ohio State Route 43, was originally constructed for $1,600,000. The newer half-mile oval was developed inside the boundaries of the older one-mile Bainbridge race track. A clubhouse was built with a bar and a dining room with a capacity of 350 persons and a large fireplace in the lounge.

=== Opening ===
The Ohio harness racing facility was officially opened during the 1952 harness season, operating for 44 nights from September 11 to October 31, 1952. It was the only new pari-mutuel harness racing track in the United States that year. Yankee Hanover, owned by the wife of John L. Wehle, won the first featured harness race at the new track in Ohio. Grandview's closing races of the season on October 31, 1952, attracted 5,057 attendees and a record $254,228 in mutuel wagering. Across 43 nights at Grandview in 1953, total wagers amounted to $6,616,312, with an average of $150,371 per night. The 1954 season of night races was disrupted when lightning disabled the track's power plant, stopping four programs. On the concluding night, a record 10,048 spectators bet $239,599, bringing the total season wagers to $5,653,369. By the year 1956, $7,042,263 was wagered per year.

=== Grandview Raceway Inc. ===
Following three years in operation, the track was taken over, with control passing to new owners on December 11, 1954. It was acquired by Grandview Raceway Inc., a Grand Circuit affiliate, for an estimated $1,000,000. Bucyrus businessman Walter J. Michael headed the group that took over Grandview Oval. The syndicate, established by Michael, his sons, McKinley Kirk, and others, secured the largest stake at Grandview by buying significant stock, taking options on additional shares, and taking over the board of directors. McKinley Kirk was appointed as Grandview's vice president and general manager. Grandview's president Jack Harris, who spearheaded the 1952 establishment of the course, supported Michael and Kirk in operations while they succeeded Edward H. Blywise and Richard Franklin Outcalt on the board.

==== Grand Circuit-era ====
The Grand Circuit feature first moved into Grandview Oval in July 1957. The week-long program was highlighted by the $7,500 Hambletonian Preview for three-year-olds, the $10,000 New Zealand Pace for four-year-olds, and the $7,500 Little Brown Jug Preview Three-Year-Old Pace.

In anticipation of Grand Circuit attendance, ten acres were cleared in June 1958, creating 2,500 new parking spaces and allowing the grounds to hold nearly 7,500 vehicles. In July 1958, the Grand Circuit in Solon drew 5,932 harness racing fans, marking its second year in a row after a 13-year absence in the state of Ohio.

== Closure ==
In November 1958, a fire destroyed the track's clubhouse and most of its grandstand. The blaze was discovered at 9:20 a.m. and spread quickly before Solon Fire Department arrived. Crews from Bainbridge and Reminderville responded to assist, but much of the facility had already been lost. All but the stables and a 2½-story caretaker’s house were destroyed in the fire, which caused about $500,000 in losses.

In the aftermath of the fire, Northfield Park took control of Grandview's racing schedule and purchased the 84-acre property, repurposing what remained as a training and stable facility.

== Track records ==
Time	Horse	Date	Driver	Notes
2:06.1	Jerry Perkins	August 11, 1955	Perry D. Pennis	World record
1:59½	Gold Worthy	August 1957	T. Wayne Smart	

== See also ==
- Northfield Park
