= William K. Dickerson =

American harness racing driver (1872–1948)

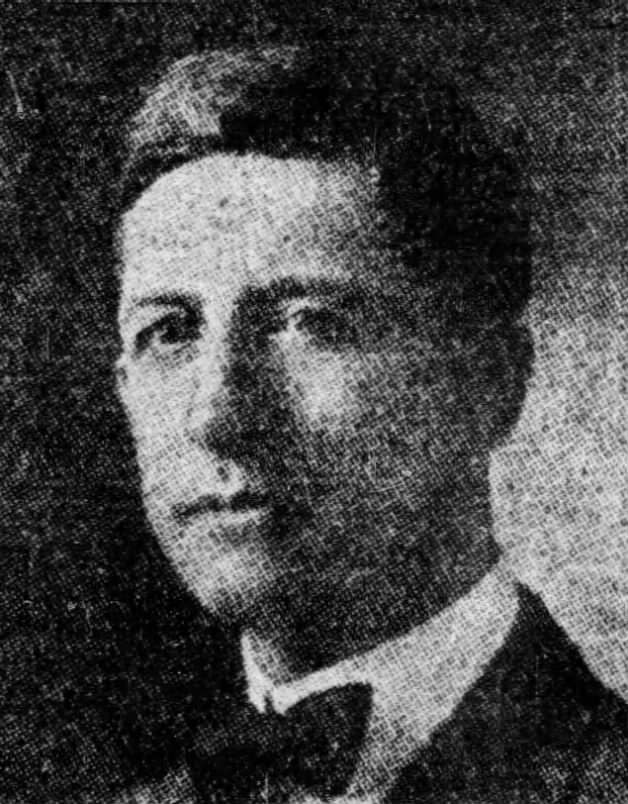

Personal information
- Nickname: Billy Dick
- Born: William Kennedy Dickerson; 1872 Greensburg, Indiana, U.S.
- Died: May 20, 1948 (aged 75–76) Goshen, New York, U.S.
- Occupations: Harness racing driver; horse trainer

Horse racing career
- Sport: Harness racing

Major racing wins
- E. H. Harriman Challenge Trophy (1925, 1929); Historic-Dickerson Cup (1925, 1926, 1929); Walnut Hall Cup (1926); Transylvania Trot (1926, 1929); Horseman Futurity Trot (1928, 1936); Horseman Futurity Pace (1936)

Honors
- United States Harness Racing Hall of Fame (1959)

Significant horses
- Titan Hanover; Highland Scott

William K. Dickerson (1872 – May 20, 1948), also known as Billy Dick, was an American harness racing driver and horse trainer.

== Early life and education ==
William Kennedy Dickerson was born in Indiana, United States, in 1872.

Tilford Dickerson, his father, was an early horseman in Indiana. William was one of seven sons in his family. The Dickerson family had long been established in the horse business. He and his brother John H. Dickerson both started out during their teenage years. His brother was once affiliated with Hanover Shoe Farms.

== Career ==
W. K. Dickerson began his career with harness racing horses at an early age in Indiana. He left Indiana in the 1890s.

He relocated to Goshen, New York, where he operated a public stable and leased Joe Patchen, establishing him as a leading sire of the period. He was elected as secretary of the Goshen Driving Club in April 1907, serving for many years.

He worked as a trainer and driver for ex-State Senator John McCarthy in 1910.

=== Arden Homestead Stable ===
From 1913, he trained the Harriman family stable under Mrs. E. H. Harriman and later worked for her sons, W. Averell Harriman and E. Roland Harriman. He had a long and successful tenure as trainer and driver for the Harriman-owned Arden Homestead Stable. The horses under Dickerson's training had reserved stalls at Good Time Park, where most were conditioned over the mile track. Some were also stabled at the Historic Track, where he served as superintendent of the grounds.

During the 1920s and 1930s, he raced on the Orange County Grand Circuit. He drove Harriman's Peter Maltby to two world record performances in 1925, setting a world half-mile mark for two-year-olds at Endicott and again at Historic Track. He also piloted Guy Ozark to match the three-year-old world record established in 1923. At The Red Mile in Lexington, Kentucky, he captured the 1926 Transylvania Trot with Guy Trogan and also won that year's Walnut Hall Cup with Guy Ozark.

By 1927, he was serving as the secretary-treasurer of the Orange County Driving Park Association, sponsors of the Grand Circuit in Orange County, New York. He was later elected vice president of the park association along with R. W. Hart and Elbridge T. Gerry in 1946.

He topped the Grand Circuit standings in 1928 for the first time, recording 15 wins ahead of Sep Palin. That year, the Indiana reinsman appeared in an endorsement for the Si-Nok Company of Indianapolis.

He was succeeded as the trainer-driver at Arden Homestead by Harry Pownall. He began serving as the general manager of the Arden Homestead Racing Stable and of Goshen's Historic Track. At the 1943 Harrisburg Auction Sale, he picked up Titan Hanover, who later won the 1945 Hambletonian Stakes.

Dickerson remained in his general manager role until he retired in 1946.

== Death ==
At 75 years old, Dickerson died in Goshen, New York, United States, on May 20, 1948.

== Legacy ==
He was inducted into the United States Harness Racing Hall of Fame in 1959.
