= New Holland, Ohio =

- Village
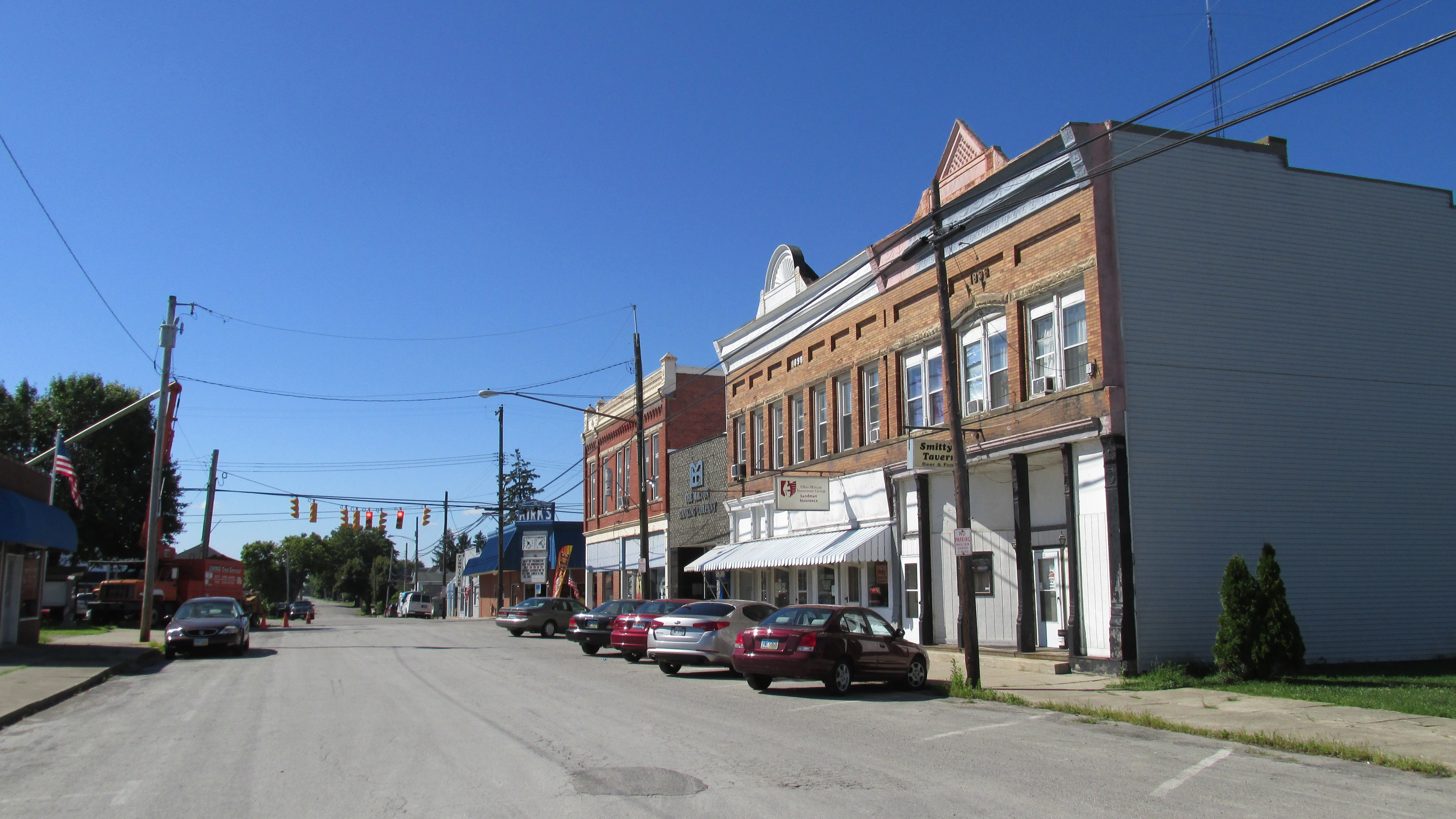
- Looking south on North Main Street in New Holland

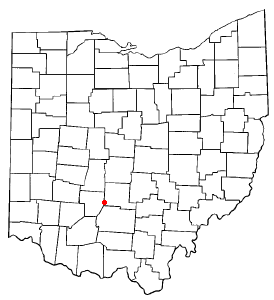
- Location of New Holland, Ohio

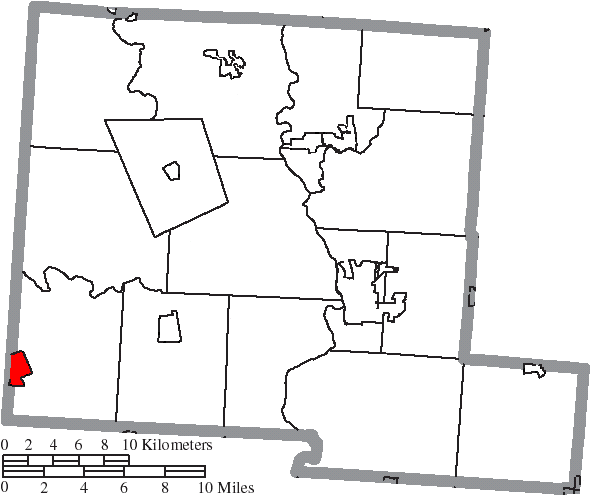
- Location of New Holland in Pickaway County
- Coordinates: 39°33′13″N 83°15′20″W
- Country: United States
- State: Ohio
- Counties: Pickaway, Fayette

Area
  - Total: 1.96 sq mi (5.07 km^{2})
  - Land: 1.96 sq mi (5.07 km^{2})
  - Water: 0 sq mi (0.00 km^{2})
- Elevation: 853 ft (260 m)

Population (2020)
  - Total: 804
  - Density: 410.6/sq mi (158.55/km^{2})
- Time zone: UTC-5 (Eastern (EST))
  - Summer (DST): UTC-4 (EDT)
- ZIP code: 43145
- Area code: 740
- FIPS code: 39-54726
- GNIS feature ID: 2399466
- Website: villageofnewholland-oh.gov

New Holland is a village in Fayette and Pickaway counties in Ohio, United States. The population was 804 at the 2020 census.

The Pickaway County portion of New Holland is part of the Columbus, Ohio Metropolitan Area, while the Fayette County portion, often called West New Holland, is part of the Washington Court House Micropolitan Statistical Area.

== Name ==
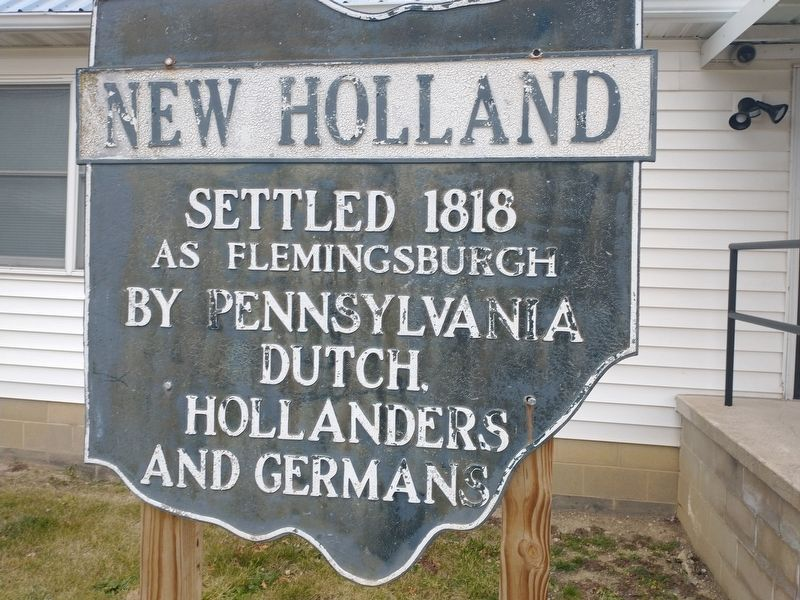
New Holland Historical Marker

The town was originally founded as Flemingsburgh (or Flemingsburg) on September 2, 1818, and was named for John Fleming, son of Captain Fleming of Berkeley County, Virginia, who settled in the area in 1802. The name was later changed to New Holland between 1818 and 1827. The village was named after Holland, the native land of a share of the first settlers.

== History ==
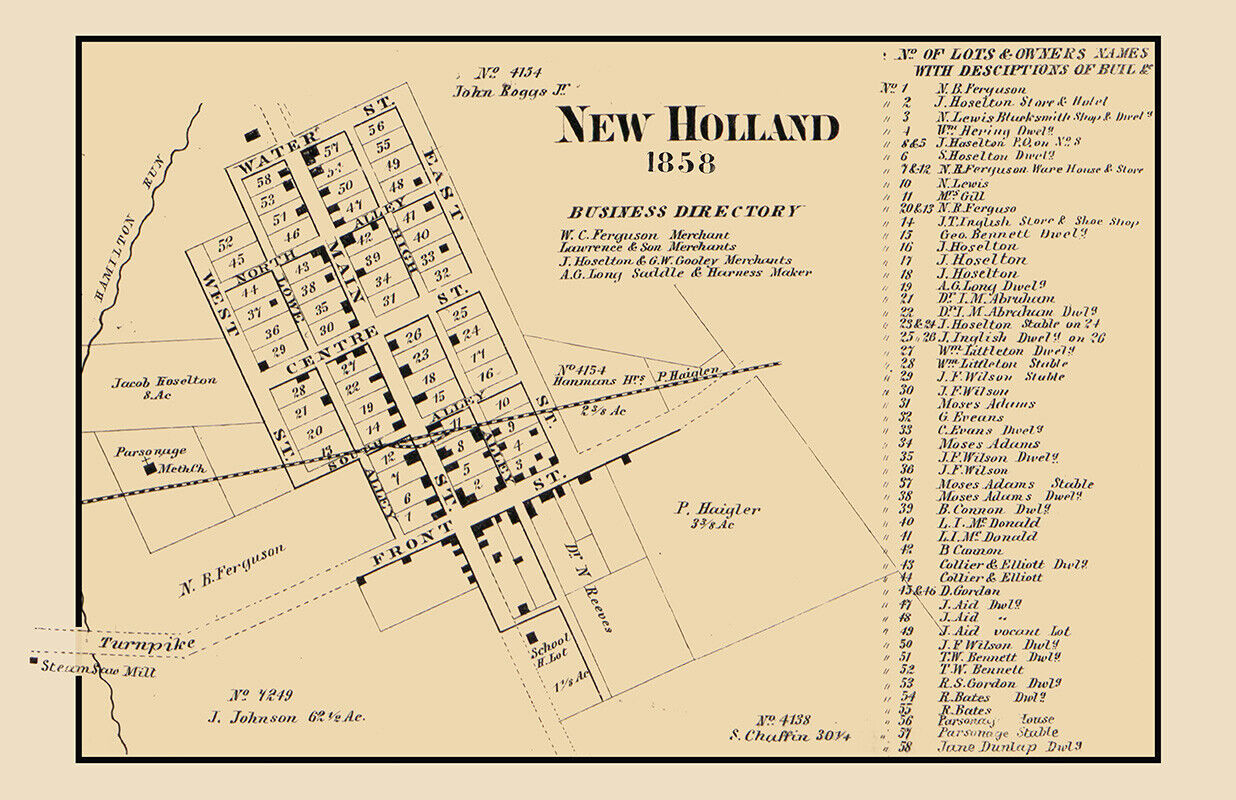
New Holland, Ohio, original 58 lots, streets, and alleys.

In 1818 the original settlers—Pennsylvania Dutch, Hollanders, and Germans—settled on "Four Corners," a tract of land in the Virginia Military District, granted to Wilkins Ogden in 1802. This tact was so called because it was, in a wilderness, the intersection of a stagecoach line running east and west, and an Indian foot trail going from north to south. This crossing is today the Main and Front Street intersection.

The settlement soon outgrew its descriptive name and was then called Flemingsburgh, for John Fleming, son of Captain Fleming of Berkeley County, Virginia, who settled in New Holland in 1802. The name remained until about 1825 when the people were thinking about having a Post Office. The settlers being of Dutch descent, renamed their settlement New Holland, the name it remains today.

Most of the houses were log cabins build in a small cluster. There were few business places for trading at that time.

The state chartered New Holland as a village in 1834.

One of the most dramatic events in New Holland's history came after the Civil War when a portion of General Sherman's Union Army marched through the covered bridge on Zanesville Cincinnati Trace [U.S. Route 22] and through New Holland. This covered bridge, which spanned over North Fork of Paint Creek on U.S. Route 22, was built in 1840, stood until 1943. Some have claimed that the old, covered bridge is now preserved in the Henry Ford Museum at Dearborn, Michigan. While Henry Ford did express admiration for the bridge, its remnants were used as scrap wood.

== Train Wreck ==
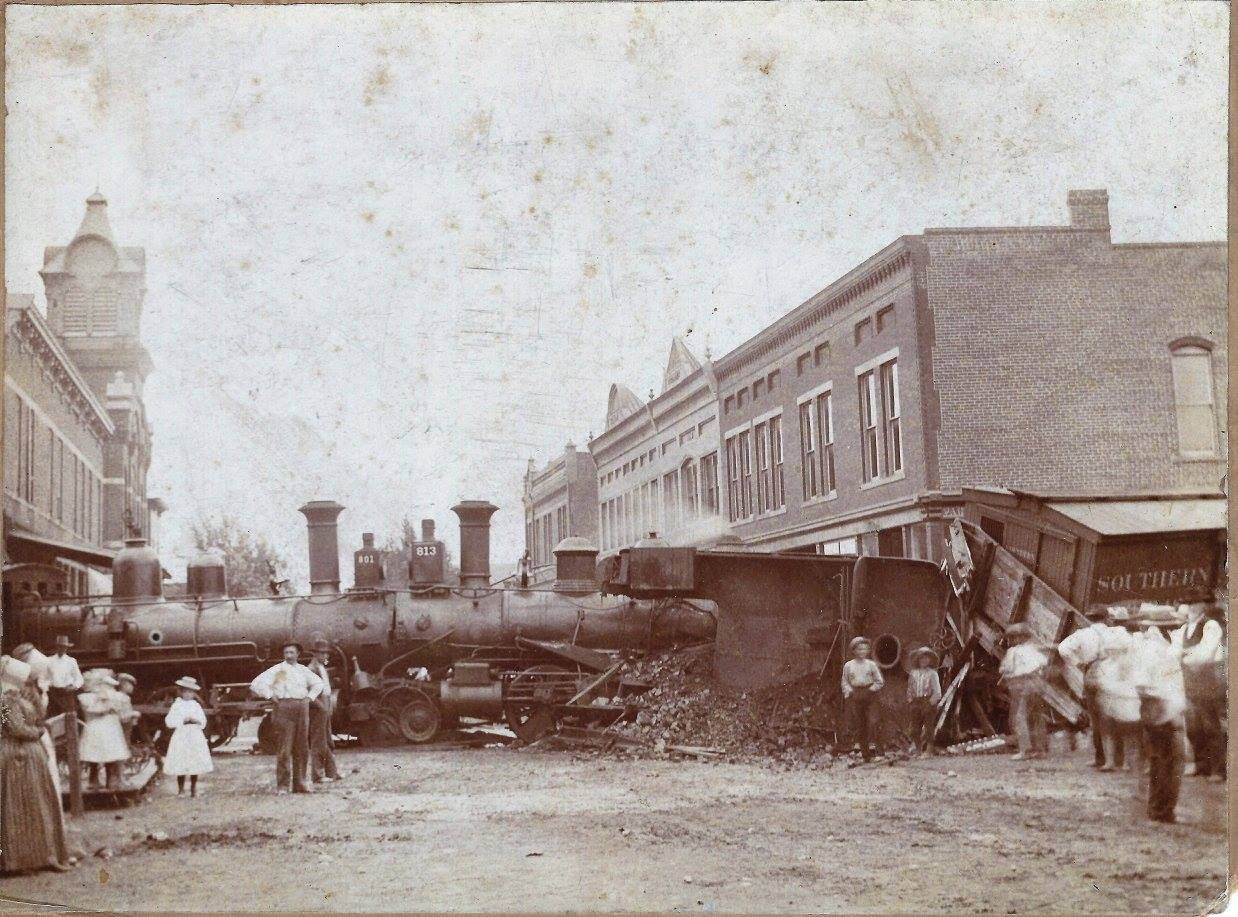
September 18, 1899, New Holland, Ohio Train Wreck

Much excitement was created on the evening of September 18, 1899, at 8 p.m., when two trains collided head on in the middle of town, at the railroad crossing located on North Main Street.

Eastbound Engine 813 had been traveling at a high speed and unbeknownst to its engineer, Charles Ditto, the train's caboose and a few cars had become uncoupled at Kingsfred (located just west of Johnson's Crossing in Union Township, Fayette County). As Engine 813 approached the village of New Holland Mr. Ditto spotted the oncoming westbound Engine 801. Setting off the train's whistle, beginning about 1/2 mile outside of New Holland, Ditto attempted to signal to the brakeman to slow down for a stop, still unaware that the caboose, where the brakeman was located, had become unattached. Realizing what had happened, Ditto quickly put his train into reverse, but it was too late to avoid a collision with the other oncoming train. The engineer of Engine 801, Joe Todhunter, by this time had noticed the approaching Engine 813. In an attempt to save his train and a large amount of freight being carried by the train, uncoupled his engine and three cars, sending them on to meet the approaching train. Eyewitness accounts claimed that the impact of the two trains was so forceful that it could be heard for several miles around. Both engines raised high into the air upon impact and crashed to the ground. Engine 801, a newer engine, suffered heavy damage, with one of its cars being completely demolished. Engine 813 meanwhile was completely destroyed, its tender being overthrown and seven of its cars were demolished, with most of them being thrown across the tracks. The impact had forced one of the cars over another after its wheels were sheared off. Another box car was broken into pieces, with about half of it being thrown and crashing into the back of the Gooley Brother's Implement Store. Fortunately, no injuries occurred as a result of the crash. Both engineers and firemen had jumped to safety just moments before the collision took place. Losses from the crash were estimated at $10,000 [roughly $373,891.67 today], and took workmen from about 10 p.m. that evening until the next morning to clean up the wreckage and debris.

== Village government ==
The first records of government date back to 1802. This was an abstract deed which listed the Mayor of Four Corners as John McDonald. The next date in the abstract which lists the mayor's name is March 14, 1837, and he was Francis Wilson. Also, Reverend Wilson is connected with the date of November 18, 1835, as mayor.

The first completed records of city government date back to April 6, 1869, when the first council chamber was organized. W.W. Blanedin was the mayor and council members were G.W. Gooley, S.R. Collier, J.M. Turner, and Henry Judy. S.S. McCallister was the recorder and J.D. Miller, by appointment, was the Marshall. Council met at McCafferty's hall on Saturday evening at seven o'clock.

Many records have been destroyed, misplaced, or are unavailable so that a complete list of mayors is not available. This is as complete as could be gathered:

No.	Portrait	Name (Birth – Death)	Term in office	Notes
1		John McDonald	1802 – Unknown	
2		W.W. Blanedin	1869 – Unknown	George Velrebonte, Treasure W.T. Gooley, Treasrure
3		G.W. Gooley	1872–1875	
4		Fernnel Evans	1875 – Unknown	
5		J.D.Orahood	1875–1878	
6		Edwin W. Timmons	1878 -1879	
7		Samuel Evans	1879 – Unknown	
8		Frank Sanderson	1879 – Unknown	
9		George Williamson	1905–1907	
10		J.T. Tarbill	1907–1909	
11		William K. Briggs	1909–1913	1st term.
12		R.A. Morgan	1913–1915	
13	New Holland Mayor Jack Zeller & Family	Israel Jackson "Jack" Zeller (1839–1922)	1915–1917	
14		Wesley W. Gooley	1917–1921	
15		Warren K. Briggs	1921–1925	2nd & 3rd term.
16		George Williamson	1929–1935	
17		C.V. Stebelton	1935–1941	
18		Warren M. Arthur	1941–1945	Resigned after failing health.
19		Marie Ankrom	1945–1947	
20		Warren K. Briggs	1947–1949	4th term.
21		Harold Speakman (1908–1983)	1953–1955	
22		Warren K. Briggs	1953–1955	5th term, died in office on June 3, 1955. Aged 66.
23		Joseph H. Gooley (1906–1964)	1955–1964	Died in office after a heart attack, aged 58.
24		Clarence Brown	1964–1965	
25	New Holland Mayor Lincoln Schart	Lincoln Schwart (1926–1980)	1965–1971	
26		Wilbur Frazier (1910–1989)	1971–1975	
27		Edward Summers	1975–1977	
28		Josef Louis	Unknown	Acting Mayor
29		Russell Jacobs Jr. (1937–2021)	1978–1983	
30		Jim Helms	1983–1987	
31		Frank Wood (1925–2016)	1987–1991	Believed to be one of the last – if not the last – World War II veteran from New Holland.
32		Phillip Funk	1991–1999	
33		Kay E. Schobert	1999–2003	
34		Anita Faye Helsel (1940–2020)	2003–2007	
–		Vacant	2007–2011	
35		Ron Spangler	2011–2015	
36		Clair "Butch" Betzko	2015–2019	Republican
37		Joe Inskeep	2019–present	

=== Current Officers ===
The village currently is served by Joe Inskeep as mayor. The current Village Administrator is Harold DeSanto, Utility Clerk is Diane Fisk, Fiscal Officer is Carmen White, Clerk of Courts is Michele Ervin, Chief of Police is Jason Lawless, and Village Council Members are Greg Shaw (President Pro-Tempore), Danny Kirkpatrick, Floyd Woolever, Zachary Fisk, Brittany Rodriquez, and Jimmy Thompson.

=== Controversy ===
On July 23, 2018, New Holland Police Sergeant Brad Mick was fired, after filing charges against his Mayor, Police Chief, and Former Police Chief. Mick charged New Holland Interim Police Chief David Conrad with forgery, Mayor Butch Betzko with complicity to forgery, and former Chief Jason Lawless with dereliction of duty and telecommunications harassment. In a statement, the attorney representing the Village said Mick "abused his position," and was pursuing a "personal agenda with these baseless charges." The village also accused him of violating "the established chain of command" and conducting "an improper search and destruction of Village property." Mick released a statement saying: "My termination does not undo the criminal acts by others, and it will not erase evidence or dismiss the charges. While it is disheartening and a violation of the law to be retaliated against and terminated for obeying the oath of office, it does not stop here."

The charges were later dropped, and Jason Lawless was appointed Police Chief again.

== Geography ==
According to the United States Census Bureau, the village has a total area of 1.88 square miles (4.87 km^{2}), all land.

== Demographics ==
Historical population
Census	Pop.	Note	%±
1870	326		—
1880	478		46.6%
1890	683		42.9%
1900	824		20.6%
1910	804		−2.4%
1920	810		0.7%
1930	741		−8.5%
1940	777		4.9%
1950	799		2.8%
1960	798		−0.1%
1970	796		−0.3%
1980	783		−1.6%
1990	841		7.4%
2000	785		−6.7%
2010	801		2.0%
2020	804		0.4%
U.S. Decennial Census

=== 2010 census ===
As of the census of 2010, there were 801 people, 308 households, and 212 families living in the village. The population density was 426.1 inhabitants per square mile (164.5/km^{2}). There were 363 housing units at an average density of 193.1 per square mile (74.6/km^{2}). The racial makeup of the village was 97.6% White, 0.2% African American, 0.4% Native American, 0.2% Asian, 1.0% from other races, and 0.5% from two or more races. Hispanic or Latino people of any race were 1.0% of the population.

There were 308 households, of which 33.8% had children under the age of 18 living with them, 51.3% were married couples living together, 9.4% had a female householder with no husband present, 8.1% had a male householder with no wife present, and 31.2% were non-families. 22.4% of all households were made up of individuals, and 11.4% had someone living alone who was 65 years of age or older. The average household size was 2.60 and the average family size was 3.06.

The median age in the village was 41.2 years. 22.7% of residents were under the age of 18; 8.3% were between the ages of 18 and 24; 24.3% were from 25 to 44; 30% were from 45 to 64; and 14.5% were 65 years of age or older. The gender makeup of the village was 50.4% male and 49.6% female.

=== 2000 census ===
As of the census of 2000, there were 785 people, 313 households, and 220 families living in the village. The population density was 420.1 inhabitants per square mile (162.2/km^{2}). There were 331 housing units at an average density of 177.1 per square mile (68.4/km^{2}). The racial makeup of the village was 97.58% White, 0.38% African American, 0.38% Native American, and 1.66% from two or more races. Hispanic or Latino people of any race were 0.25% of the population.

There were 313 households, out of which 29.7% had children under the age of 18 living with them, 56.2% were married couples living together, 10.2% had a female householder with no husband present, and 29.4% were non-families. 25.6% of all households were made up of individuals, and 16.0% had someone living alone who was 65 years of age or older. The average household size was 2.51 and the average family size was 3.00.

In the village, the population was spread out, with 24.5% under the age of 18, 8.2% from 18 to 24, 27.9% from 25 to 44, 23.4% from 45 to 64, and 16.1% who were 65 years of age or older. The median age was 37 years. For every 100 females there were 94.8 males. For every 100 females age 18 and over, there were 90.7 males.

The median income for a household in the village was $32,188, and the median income for a family was $36,696. Males had a median income of $30,625 versus $24,191 for females. The per capita income for the village was $15,613. About 4.4% of families and 7.9% of the population were below the poverty line, including 5.5% of those under age 18 and 14.7% of those age 65 or over.

== Notable residents ==
- Terry Lyons, baseball player

== Schools ==
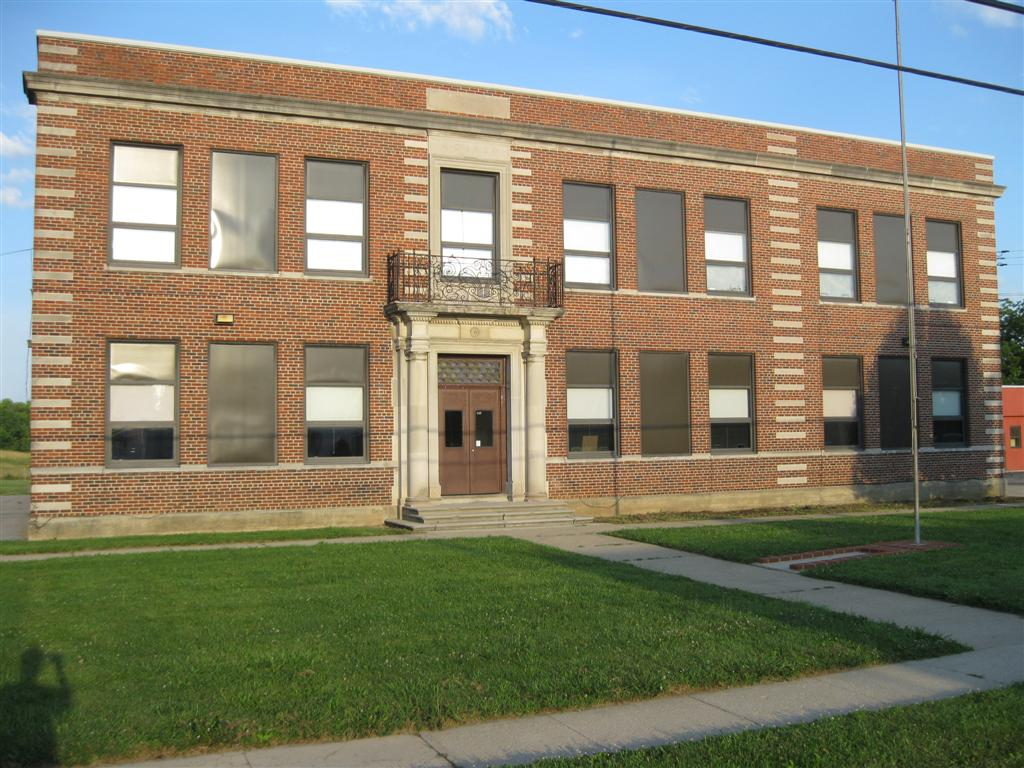
New Holland School, built in 1927

Children residing in New Holland, Ohio, attend Miami Trace Local School District. However, the town historically held its own schooling. From its founding in 1887 until the last class graduated on May 27, 1959, New Holland High School served the community.

== Media ==
=== Newspapers ===
The New Holland Review was published from 1877 to 1879.

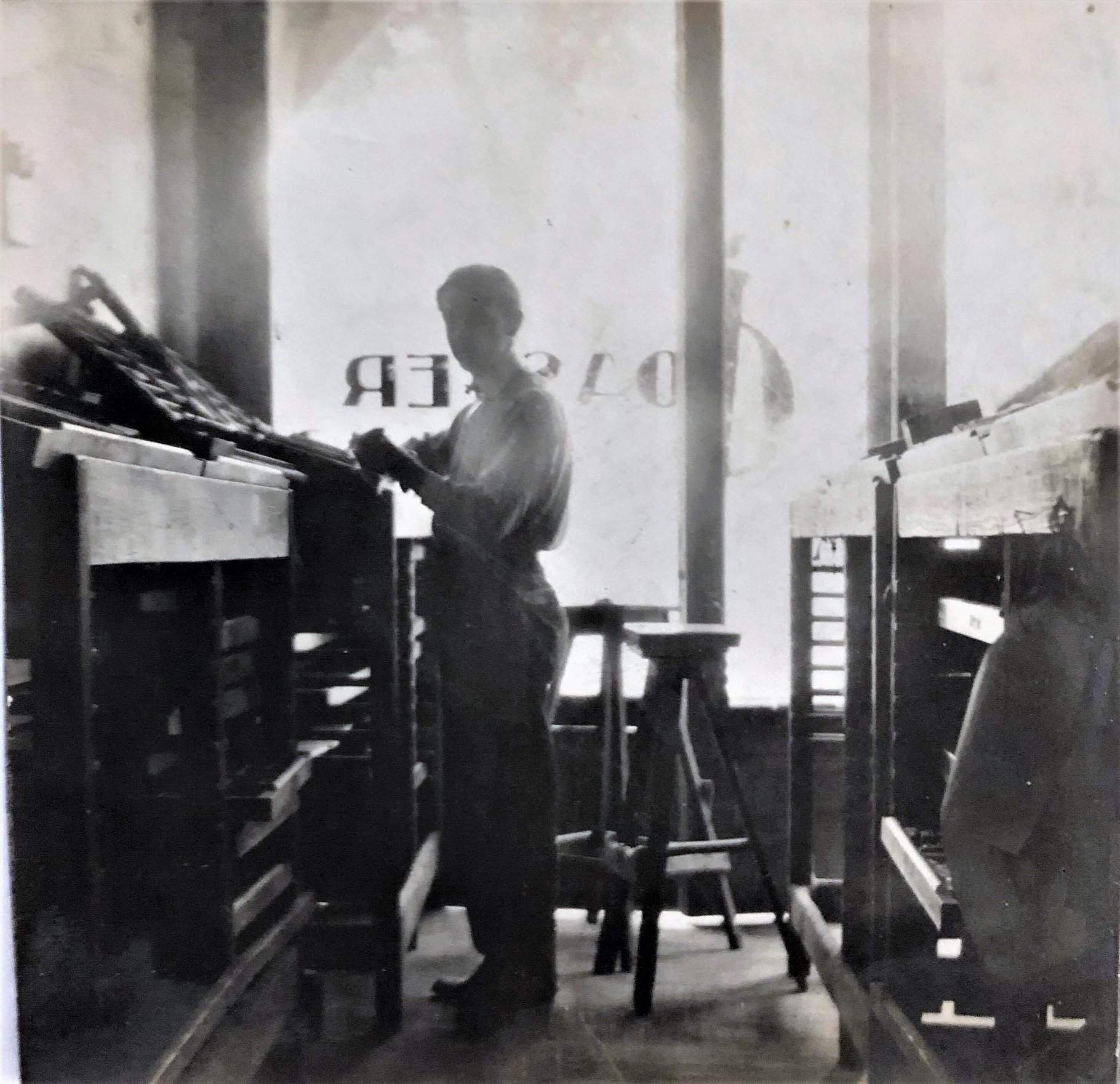
New Holland Leader Publisher Percy May

The New Holland Leader was the community newspaper for 93 years. In 1887, it was established as Plain Talk. The name New Holland leader wasn't used until 1900. The Leader was a weekly newspaper, published each Thursday. The paper contained the news and events of the town. Births, marriages, deaths, the social happenings, the coming and going of the people, and notes from the schools and churches were just some other items that could be found in the Leader.

E.B. Lewis was the first publisher of the newspaper. other publishers throughout the years included:

Years	Name
1905–1921	Percy May
1921–1947	Wendell Turner
1947	Earl Hinkle
1947–1965	Lawrence Hunter
1965–1972	Charles Mallory
1972–1981	Greenfield Times

The Leader was printed for years in the back of the old post office located at 105 N. Main St. The Leader office was then moved across the street in March 1965. This remained the office until Charles Mallory sold the paper to the Greenfield Times. In January 1973, the Leader office was moved to 212 W. Front St. in the home of Mrs. Pat Funk. Mrs. Funk was the correspondent for the paper. The New Holland Leader ceased publication on January 1, 1981.

== Gallery ==
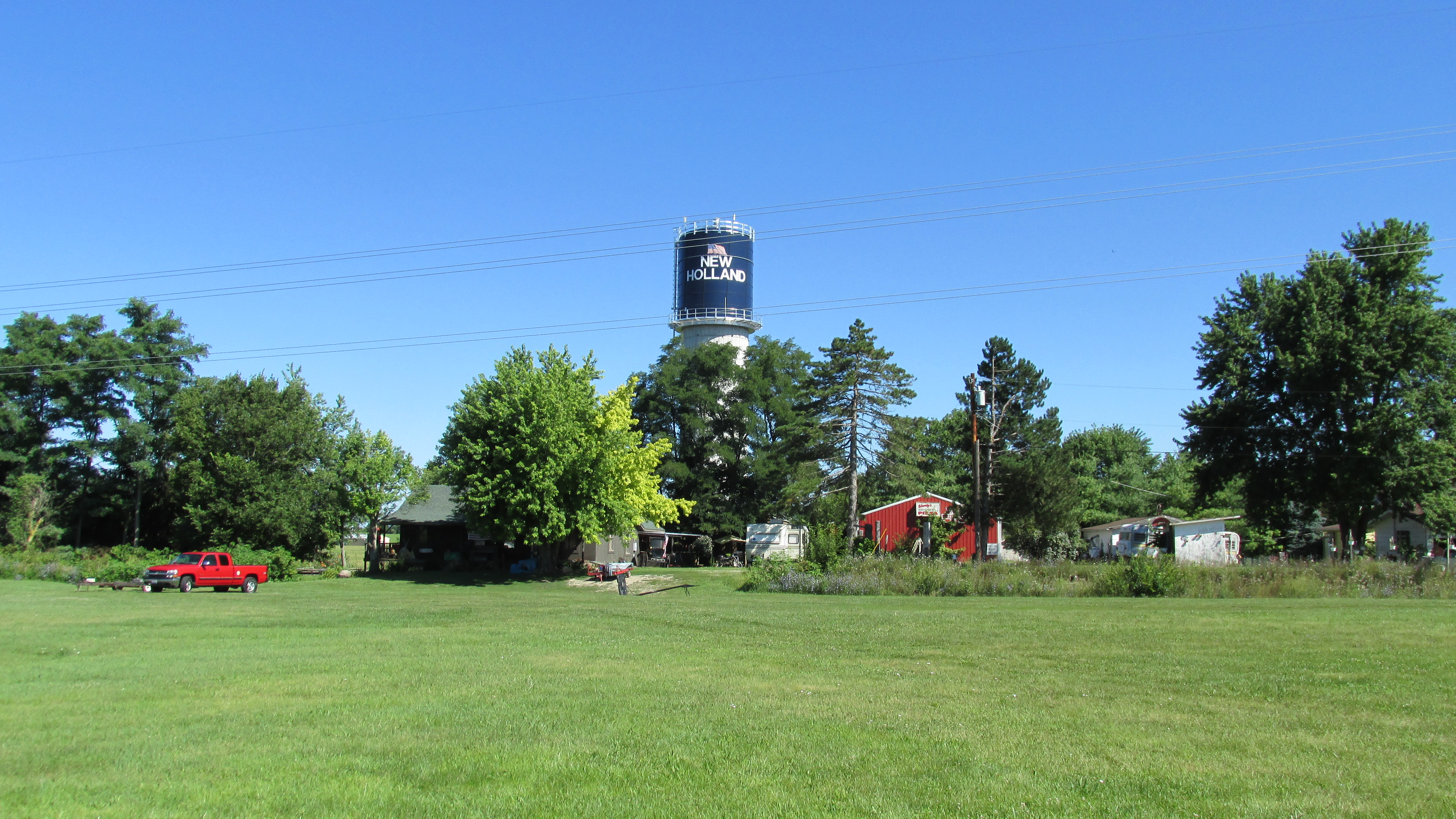
New Holland water tower

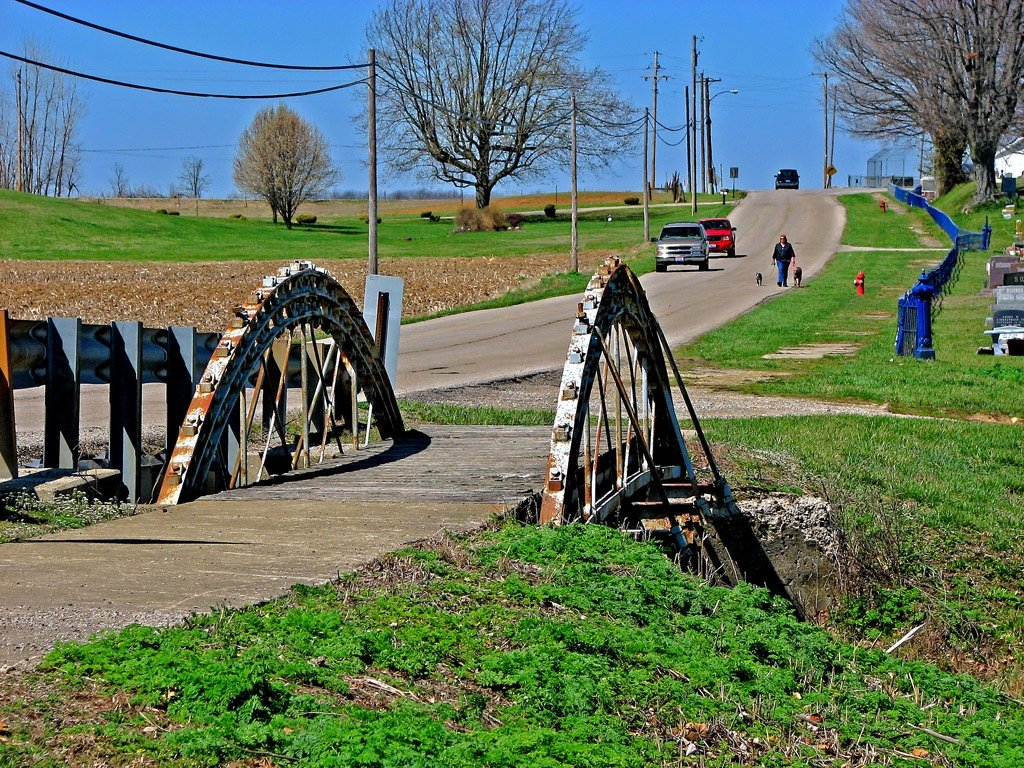
An old bridge in New Holland

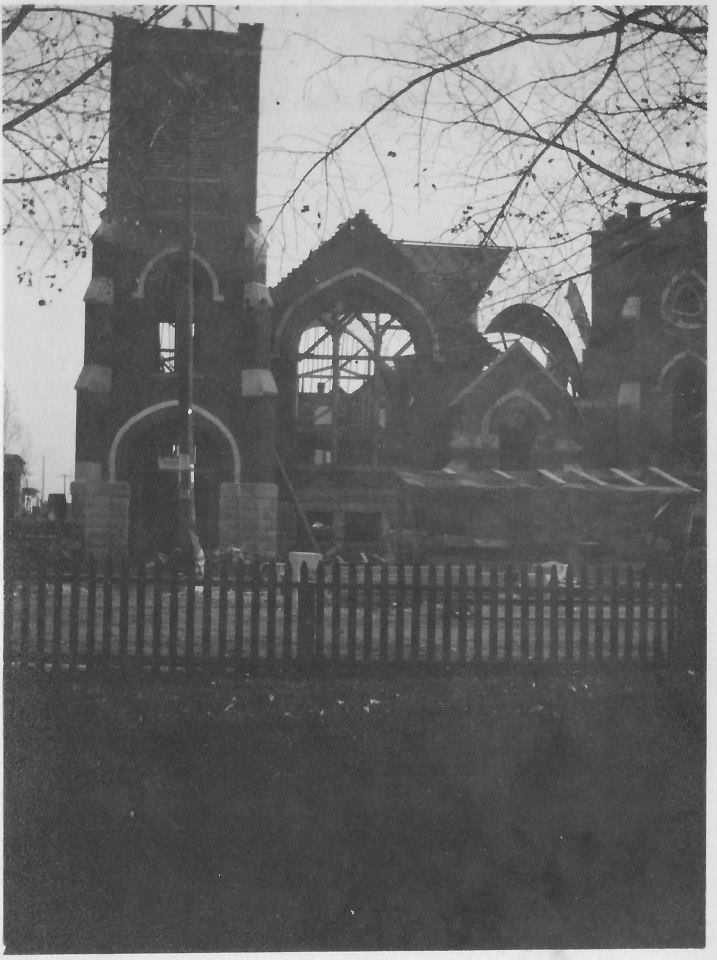
Building of New Holland Methodist Church

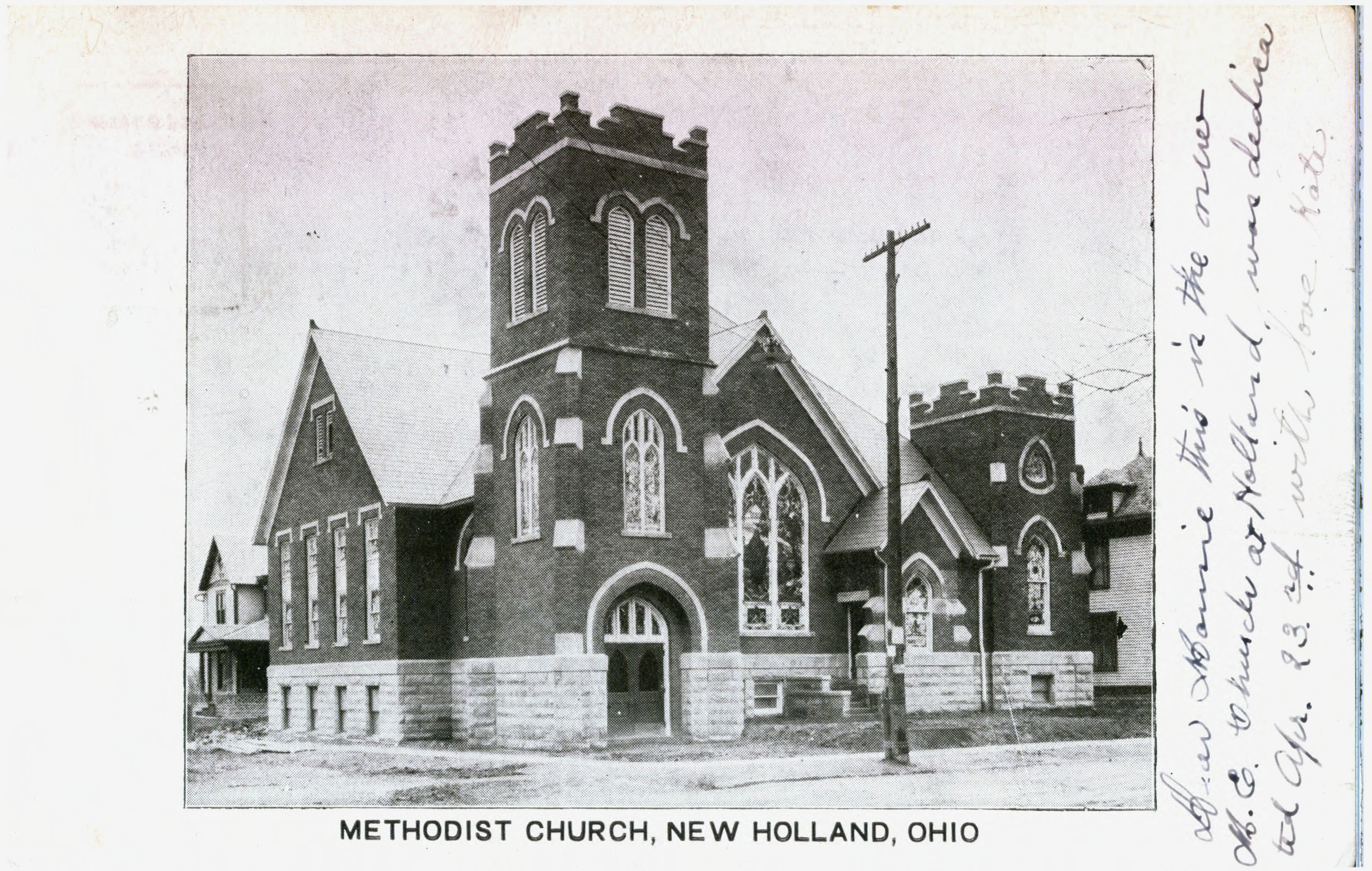
New Holland Methodist Church

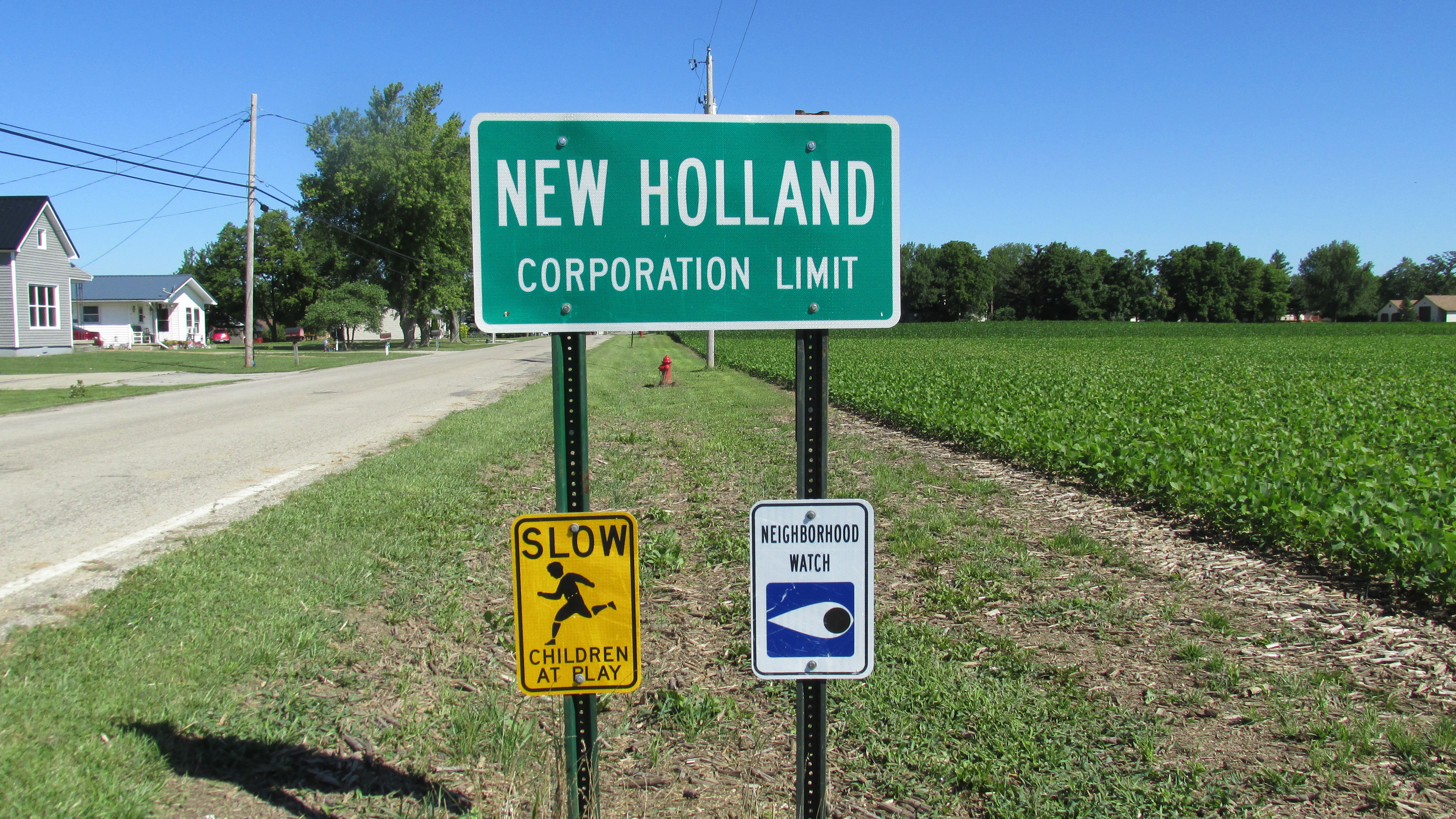
New Holland Corporation Limit Sign

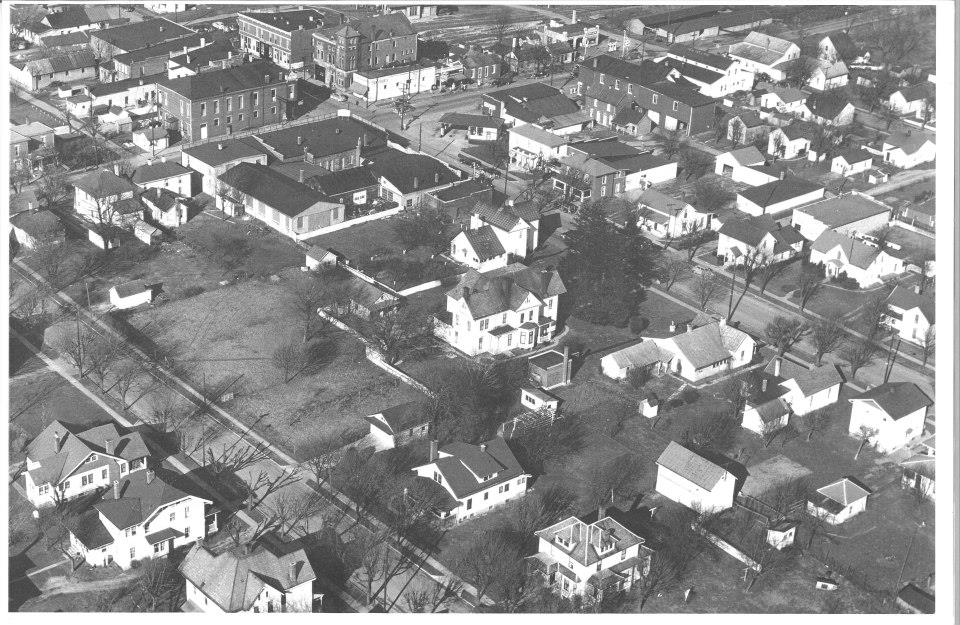
Overview of New Holland (1948)

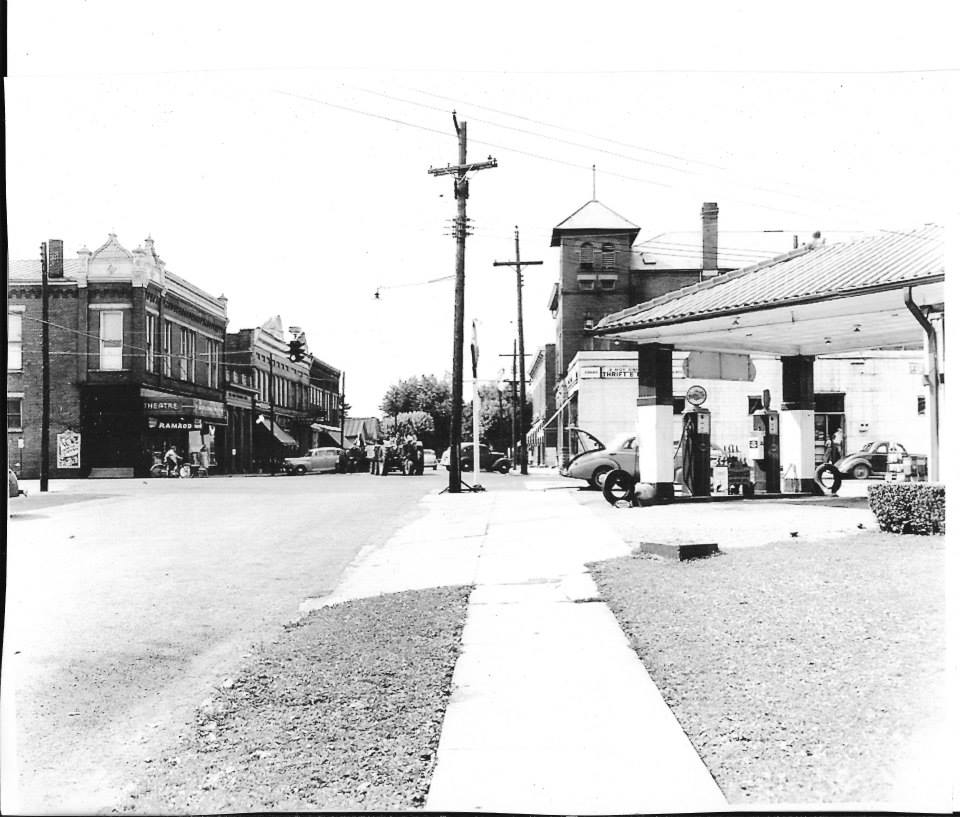
New Holland Main Street (1949)

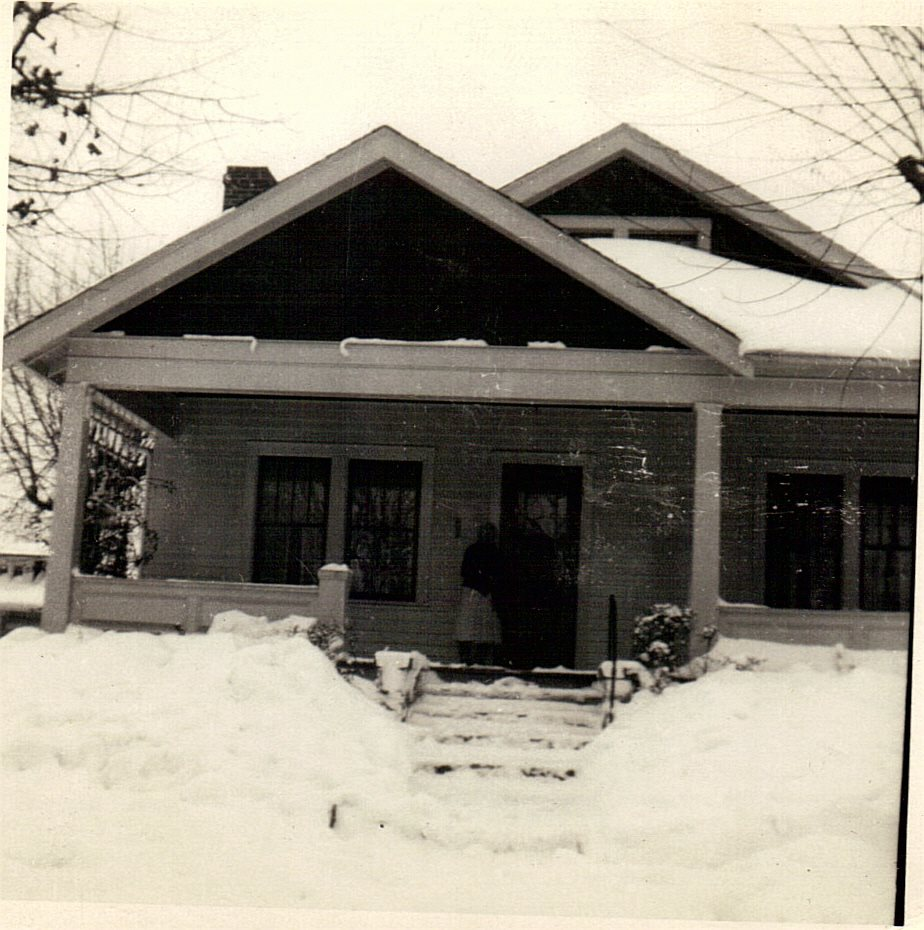
Blizzard of 1950
