= Hanover's Bertha =

American Standardbred racehorse

Hanover's Bertha (1927–1944) was a Standardbred horse and harness racing champion bred by Alexander B. Coxe and foaled at Hanover Shoe Farms in Hanover, Pennsylvania. She won the 1930 Hambletonian Stakes at Good Time Park in Goshen, New York, as well as the Kentucky Futurity at The Red Mile in Lexington, Kentucky.

Hanover's Bertha was the first winner to go on to foal another Hambletonian winner, 1937's Shirley Hanover. In 1957 Hanover's Bertha was inducted into the United States Harness Racing Hall of Fame.
