= Bion Shively =

American harness racing driver (1878–1970)

Personal information
- Nickname: Oklahoma Sage
- Born: Bion Shively; March 26, 1878 Goodland, Indiana, U.S.
- Died: February 24, 1970 (aged 91) Pomona, California, U.S.
- Occupations: harness racing driver; horse trainer

Horse racing career
- Sport: Harness racing

Major racing wins
- Maud S. Stake (1945, 1948, 1949); Arthur S. Tompkins Memorial (1946); Delaware Gazette (1946); Reading Fair Futurity (1945, 1946); Championship Stallion Stake (1947); Historic–Dickerson Cup (1947); Transylvania Trot (1946, 1948); Golden West Trot (1948); Nancy Hanks (1948, 1949); Trotting Derby (1948, 1949); Hambletonian Stakes (1952); Kentucky Futurity (1952)

Honors
- United States Harness Racing Hall of Fame (1968)

Significant horses
- The Colonel's Lady; Gay Song; Rodney; Sharp Note

Bion Shively (March 26, 1878 – February 24, 1970) was an American harness racing driver and horse trainer.

== Early life ==
Bion "Bi" Shively was born in Goodland, Indiana, United States, on March 26, 1878. He was the son of Ira and Evelyn Maxwell Shively. When he was only a year old, his family relocated to Oklahoma.

His uncles were Al and Uriah Shively, former proprietors of the Shively livery barn on South Main Street in Stillwater, Oklahoma. At 9 years old, his family relocated to York, Nebraska. He attended school until about age 13.

== Career ==
=== Early career ===
As a young boy, he frequently snuck into the York County fairgrounds, staying near the stables with hopes of riding for Harve Pickrel. Pickrel, who eventually took Bion under his wing, was a noted breeder of trotters, pacers, and gallopers, drawing buyers from across the United States. He got his start as a jockey in thoroughbred flat racing at age 9. Bion rode his first running horse at the York County fairgrounds in 1887, placing third and winning $8. At 12, he was a regular jockey at county fairs. When he was 14, he rode horses at the fairgrounds in Aurora, Nebraska. Under the guidance of Pickrel, he developed into a first-rate driver.

He worked with running horses until 1894 before moving into trotters and pacers in 1895, when he entered harness racing and drove a sulky for the first time at 17. His uncle had noticed his progress and allowed him to drive an old pacer called Stratton. He started out on tracks across Oklahoma, Kansas, and Nebraska.

=== Military service ===
Bion's racing career was interrupted by military service in 1898. He enlisted in the United States Army during the Spanish–American War. As an infantryman, he was deployed overseas and took part in the Philippine Insurrection. He served as a member of Company "A" of the 1st Nebraska Infantry Regiment.

=== Harness racing career ===
Upon his return from the war, he turned his attention to training and driving standardbred horses. The Spanish-American War veteran went on to operate a public harness racing stable. He spent 1900 to 1944 moving between tracks, competing on the Grand Circuit and falling back to lesser circuits whenever his stable ran thin. He made his Grand Circuit debut in 1910, winning with the pacer Sunny Jim at Kalamazoo. He was the seventh-leading money winner on the Great Western Circuit in 1911 among 100 drivers earning more than $1,000.

He raced on the California fair circuit prior to the legalization of parimutuel wagering. During the 1920s and early 1930s, he raced often at the San Joaquin County Fair, where trotters and pacers headlined in Stockton, California. He became a leading driver for Midwestern stables that shipped to California for the fair season. He trained for a Canadian patron and, through those connections, acquired the Canadian pacers Lady Helen and Jerry The Tramp in late 1929 for Russell and Allen of Littleton, Colorado. He went on to campaign their string of five horses. By 1940, Shively maintained a 10-horse stable owned by several prominent West Coast patrons, including John P. Scripps, a San Diego newspaper publisher, and A. H. Lamberth of Los Angeles. He also worked for many years as a trainer for Peter Marengo III of Stockton.

In the fall of 1940, he bought the three-year-old Gay Song in Indianapolis for J. T. Allen of Denver and campaigned him on the Pacific Coast tracks in 1941. With coast racing disrupted by World War II, Shively left Pomona and moved the Allen stable east, led by Gay Song, who raced across Old Orchard, Goshen, Milwaukee, and Lexington. Ahead of the 1943 season, he wintered at the Miami fairgrounds and handled the string of Dr. W. R. Scott of Baxter Springs. He competed in the North Randall Grand Circuit.

He landed his first big break after mill owner R. Horace Johnston of Charlotte signed him to a private training and driving contract in 1944. He became the driver of The Colonel's Lady, with whom he won his first Maud S. Stake-Aged Trot in 1945 and captured the 1946 Transylvania Trot. Shively began training Rodney, a bay colt bred and owned by R. H. Johnston, in the mid-1940s. He guided Rodney to win the Historic-Dickerson Cup at the Historic Track in 1947. He also took the opening heat of the 1947 Hambletonian Stakes, finishing second next to Sep Palin's Hoot Mon. He considered Rodney the best trotter he ever trained and drove.

Beginning in 1946, he became a regular on the Western Harness Racing Association program at Hollywood Park and Santa Anita Park.

After R. H. Johnson's death in 1949, Shively considered stepping away but chose to continue with a smaller stable. He trained one year for A. L. Derby of Wichita. He soon accepted Clyde W. Clark's request to manage his newly acquired harness horses, including the yearling Sharp Note, bought for $1,000. On August 7, 1952, he drove Sharp Note to victory in the 27th Hambletonian Stakes at Goshen, New York. Despite placing 10th in the opening heat, he captured the next two one-mile heats to win his first Hambletonian at 74.

In 1959, his 68th year in the sport, he remained active on the harness racing circuit. That year, at age 81, Shively retired from competition at Hollywood Park Racetrack, then the country's oldest competitive athlete. Despite training hundreds of trotters over the years, he had only owned five horses of his own during his career.

== Personal life ==
With his wife, Gertrude, he had a son named Jerry Shively.

Bion Shively died on February 24, 1970, in Pomona, California, United States.

== Legacy ==
At age 74, Shively became the oldest driver to win the Hambletonian Stakes.

Carl Carmer described Shively as "the most unforgettable character" in a biographical sketch published in the November 1962 issue of Reader's Digest.

In November 1967, he was among six men chosen for the Living Hall of Fame, becoming the first driver honored, as previous awards had been given only to horses and their owners. He was formally inducted into the United States Harness Racing Hall of Fame in 1968.
