= John Dickerson (trainer) =

American horse trainer

John "Johnny Dick" Dickerson (1863 in Versailles, Indiana – August 30, 1944) was an American horse trainer inducted into the Harness Racing Hall of Fame.

He began in 1893 as a second trainer for Budd Doble. Later, as an independent trainer, he had success with the "Iron Horse" Joe Patchen, sire of Dan Patch, as well as Anaconda. As a breeder, he bred Kohl, Almeda and many others.

In 1900, he contracted to train and race for Watson B. Dickerman of Hillandale Farm, New Rochelle, New York, who owned Bellini, a top sire. Dickerson developed Soprano, Atlantic Express, Nedda, who was champion mare for years, among others.

He retired to California but moved back to Indiana, where he died in 1944. He was inducted into the Harness Racing Hall of Fame in 1958. His brother William K. Dickerson is a Hall of Fame trainer and owner.
