= United States Trotting Association =

Sports governing body in the United States

The United States Trotting Association (USTA), headquartered in Columbus, Ohio, is the governing body for the sport of harness racing in the United States. It licenses drivers and trainers; trains racing officials; makes the rules of racing; maintains racing and breeding records; and promotes the sport. The association maintains a comprehensive website. The American Harness Horse of the Year award is chosen in a poll conducted by the USTA in conjunction with the United States Harness Writers Association.

== History ==
The United States Trotting Association (USTA) was founded in 1939 by Edward Harriman. It remained the only governing body in the sport of harness racing until the 1960s. It is headquartered in Westerville, Ohio. In some areas, the USTA remains the only group to sanction harness races.
