= Northfield Park Racino =

Casino in Summit County, Ohio, U.S.

Coordinates: 41.3492°N 81.5214°W

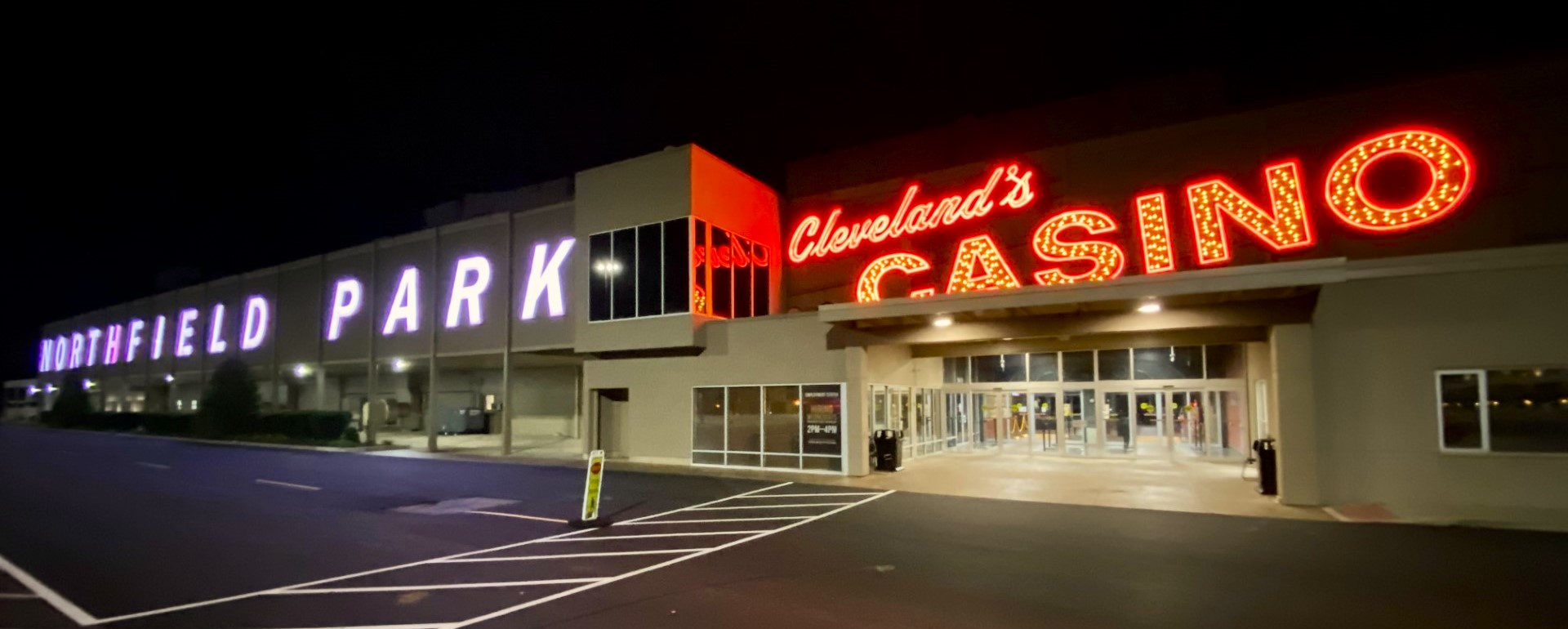
- Exterior view at night as MGM Northfield Park (October 2023)
- Interactive map of Northfield Park Racino
- Location: Northfield, Ohio, U.S.; 10777 Northfield Road, 44067
- Opened: December 18, 2013; 12 years ago
- Theme: Heritage (2026–present); Las Vegas (2019–2026); Rock and roll (2013–2019)
- Gaming space: 200,000 square feet (19,000 m^{2})
- Signature attractions: Center Stage (formerly Hard Rock Live)
- Notable restaurants: Valley's Edge Steaks & Seafood; Overtime Grill & Bar; Concerto Italian Kitchen; The Buffet; Hard Rock Cafe (2013–2019)
- Casino type: Racino
- Owner: Vici Properties
- Operating license holder: Clairvest
- Previous names: Hard Rock Rocksino (2013–2019); MGM Northfield Park (2019–2026)
- Renovated in: 2018–2019; 2026
- Website: northfieldparkracino.com
Northfield Park
- Interactive map of Northfield Park
- Date opened: 1958
- Race type: Standardbred
- Course type: Half-mile oval
- Notable races: Battle of Lake Erie; Carl Milstein Memorial Pace; Cleveland Trotting Classic; Courageous Lady

The Northfield Park Racino (previously MGM Northfield Park and Hard Rock Rocksino Northfield Park) is a racino in Northfield, Ohio, United States, a community near Cleveland. Northfield Park conducts more than 200 harness racing nights each year. It is owned by Vici Properties, and operated by Clairvest Group as of April 2026. The racino was formerly operated by Hard Rock International from 2013 to 2018 and MGM Resorts International from 2018 to 2026.

== History ==
=== Background ===
Originally constructed in 1934, Northfield Park racetrack was originally known as Sportsman Park, with a focus on midget car racing. After 20 years as a successful car racing facility, interest began to wane and in 1956, Sportsman Park was demolished to make way for what would eventually become one of the nation's premier harness racing tracks under the initial leadership of Walter J. Michael, who opened Northfield Park on August 23, 1957. Michael sold the track to Carl Milstein for $7.5 million in 1972. However, Michael kept managing the meets until he also sold them to Dr. Vic Ippolito and Cleveland lawyer William Snyder in 1974. The track expanded into winter racing with over 200 race nights a year by 1976, though the track continued to financially decline.

In 1981, management acquired the Painesville meet from Homer Marshman, giving them operation of all meets. The track lost $1 million even though 458,000 people bet $65 million when doing the races. Following a 1984 state tax break, Milstein took direct control, and year-round harness racing commenced in 1985, with his son, Brock Milstein, later taking over management in 1999. By 2002, the president of Northfield Park was Myron Charna. Cedar Downs is the only off-track betting parlor in Ohio and is owned and operated by Northfield Park. Cedar Downs is located in Sandusky, Ohio at the entrance to the Cedar Point Causeway. Northfield purchased the facility in the summer of 2005. It had previously been operated by Raceway Park, a Toledo harness track.

In the spring of 2008, Northfield Park constructed the Trackside Lounge. Trackside at Northfield Park is a state-of-the-art Sports Bar, featuring three-dozen flat-screen television monitors, private seating areas, full bar service and snack menu. In addition to Northfield's full simulcast agenda, Trackside broadcasts major sporting events including Guardians, Cavaliers and Browns games, March Madness, the World Series, Super Bowl, NASCAR and more. The Trackside Barbecue features award-winning ribs, pulled pork sandwiches and more, and food from the barbecue can be brought into the Trackside Lounge, or eaten in the barbecue tent pavilion.

=== 2009–2013: Development and opening ===
Exterior view at sunset as Hard Rock (February 2014)

In early 2009, the Ohio Legislature initiated legislation that would allow each of the state's seven tracks, including Northfield, to install 2,000 slot machines under guidelines developed by the Ohio State Racing Commission. In July 2009, slot machines were approved, and were installed at Northfield Park pending the approval of Governor John Kasich. Brock Milstein contributed over $500,000 to the campaign to legalize slot machines.

In May 2012, Northfield Park partnered with Hard Rock International, with construction starting on December 30 of that year, and on January 28, 2013, they announced that the racino would open as the Hard Rock Rocksino Northfield Park, which opened on December 18, 2013 at 5:00 p.m. EST with 2,300 video lottery terminals. A ceremonial guitar smash was held, alongside the appearances of Brock Milstein, Jim Allen, and Bernie Kosar of the Cleveland Browns. Joan Jett and the Blackhearts performed in the racino's 2,200-seat Hard Rock Live. The racino cost $268 million to build, and had 200,000 square feet (19,000 m^{2}).

=== 2016–present: Rebranding ===
Initial dining at the Hard Rock Rocksino included Hard Rock Cafe, Constant Grind Coffee & Bar, Fresh Harvest Buffet, and Kosar's Wood-Fried Grill. Concerto Italian Kitchen was added on June 15, 2016.

On July 11, 2018, MGM Growth Properties bought the property from Milstein Entertainment for $1.06 billion. Hard Rock continued to operate the property under a management agreement with the new owners. On April 1, 2019, MGM Growth's majority owner, MGM Resorts International, bought the Rocksino's operating business from MGM Growth for $275 million in stock, assumed control from Hard Rock, and rebranded the property as MGM Northfield Park, while Hard Rock Live rebranded as Center Stage. MGM Resorts would lease the property from MGM Growth for initial rent of $60 million per year.

As part of the rebrand, Hard Rock Cafe rebranded as the TAP Sports Bar, while the Fresh Harvest Buffet was rebranded to simply The Buffet. Vici Properties acquired MGM Growth for $17 billion, including Northfield Park, in 2022. In October 2025, MGM agreed to sell the operations of Northfield Park to a private equity firm, Clairvest Group, for $546 million. Clairvest would lease the property from Vici for 25 years. The sale closed in April 2026, and the property was rebranded as Northfield Park Racino.

== See also ==
- Hard Rock Hotel & Casino Sacramento at Fire Mountain
- Rocksino by Hard Rock Deadwood
- Thistledown (racecourse)
