= Delaware County Fairgrounds racetrack =

Racetrack in Ohio

Coordinates: 40.316547°N 83.0759743°W

- Location: Delaware, Ohio; United States
- Owned by: Delaware County Agricultural Society
- Date opened: 1946
- Race type: Harness
- Course type: 1/2 mile dirt oval
- Notable races: Little Brown Jug, Jugette

The Delaware County Fairgrounds racetrack is a half-mile dirt racing oval for harness racing events in Delaware, Ohio operated by the Delaware County Agricultural Society since 1946. The most important race run here is the Little Brown Jug. The premier event in the United States for three-year-old pacers, it is the third and final leg of the Triple Crown of Harness Racing series.

Some of the other races contested at the Delaware County Fairgrounds racetrack are the Little Brown Jugette, the Buckette 3YO Filly Trot, the Ohio Breeders Championship races, the Old Oaken Bucket, and the Ms Versatility Final.
