= Shadow Play (horse) =

American Standardbred racehorse

- Breed: Standardbred
- Sire: The Panderosa
- Grandsire: Western Hanover
- Dam: Matts Filly
- Damsire: Matt's Scooter
- Sex: Stallion
- Foaled: 5 June 2005; Hanover, Pennsylvania
- Country: United States
- Colour: Black
- Breeder: C. S. Hayes (USA)
- Owner: Dr Ian Moore, R G McGroup Ltd, Serge Savard
- Trainer: Dr Ian Moore, Mark Ford
- Record: 49: 20-9-5
- Earnings: $1,549,881
- Gait: Pace
- Driver: David Miller, Rick Zeron, Mark MacDonald, Paul MacDonell, Tim Tetrick, Jason Brewer, Dr Ian Moore
- Mile record: 1:47 4/5

Major wins
- Adios Pace (2008) Little Brown Jug (2008) Windy City Pace (2008) American National (2008) US Pacing Championship (2009)

Honours
- Canadian Horse Racing Hall of Fame (2022) Pocono Downs Horse of the Year (2008)
- Last updated on 2024-04-30

Shadow Play (foaled 5 June 2005 in Pennsylvania) is a world-record-holding standardbred racehorse. He was sired by The Panderosa, out of Matts Filly, a Matts Scooter mare. The colt was purchased as a yearling for $16,000, and is owned by Dr Ian Moore of Charlottetown, PEI, R G McGroup LTD of Bathurst, NB, and Hockey Hall of Fame inductee Serge Savard of Saint-Bruno-de-Montarville, Quebec. In 2022, Shadow Play was inducted into the Canadian Horse Racing Hall of Fame.

== 2 Year Old Campaign ==
Shadow Play made his racing debut on 21 June 2007 in Charlottetown, Prince Edward Island, Canada. Along with owner and trainer Ian Moore, he beat a field of maiden pacers by 4-1/2 lengths.

Shortly thereafter, Moore shipped the colt to Ontario, where he raced for the remainder of his 2-year-old year. He finished 2nd in 2 legs of the Dream Maker Pacing Series, followed by a 4th in the final.

The highlight of his year was a 3rd-place finish in an elimination of The Metro Pace at Mohawk Racetrack. Assigned an outside post, Shadow Play never really got into the race despite pacing his own mile in 1:51-3/5.

He completed his freshman campaign with a mark of 1:57.2 taken at Mohawk Racetrack while compiling 3 wins, 3 seconds, and 3 thirds in 13 starts and earning $31,151.

== 3 Year Old Campaign ==
On 12 April 2008, Shadow Play surfaced for his second year with a 1:58 qualifier in Charlottetown, where he was 14 lengths the best. He returned to the track one week later to make his parimutuel debut, where he won by 13 lengths in 1:56.

Shadow Play's next start came in the Diplomat Pacing Series at Woodbine Racetrack in Toronto, where he returned a winner in a new career best 1:52-1/5. After winning both his starts in the initial legs of the Diplomat, he was sent away as favourite in the final but finished a fading 4th.

On 1 July 2008, Shadow Play made his racing debut for high-profile trainer Mark Ford. Leaving from the outside at Pocono Downs, a 5/8-mile track in Wilkes-Barre, Pennsylvania, he finished third after being parked every step. The winner, Upfront Hannahsboy, set a new track record for 3-year-old colt & gelding pacers by virtue of his 1:49-2/5 victory.

Shadow Play then reeled off two victories at Pocono Downs, winning in 1:50-1/5 and 1:49-4/5, before breaking stride in a Pennsylvania Sires Stake event at The Meadows Racetrack and Casino near Pittsburgh.

On 1 August 2008, he won an elimination of the Coors Delvin Miller Adios. With leading Grand Circuit driver David Miller in control, Shadow Play eased off the gate before making his move. Clearing just before the half, he opened up by 2 lengths on the field and maintained that advantage as he powered home in a world record for 3-year-old colt & gelding pacers on a 5/8-mile track, 1:48-2/5. This mile was 2/5-seconds from the all-aged world record and tied the 2nd-fastest mile on a 5/8th-mile track ever. He returned 8 days later to capture the $350,000 final of the Adios with a time of 1:50-4/5.

On 9 September 2008, it was announced that Shadow Play was named Horse of the Year at Pocono Downs.

On 18 September 2008, he again stepped into the record books. In his first heat of the Little Brown Jug, Shadow Play tied Mr Feelgood's stakes record of 1:50 scoring over Badlands Nitro. Though that record was broken in the next race by Lonestar Legend, Shadow Play returned to capture the Little Brown Jug, winning the second heat in a time of 1:50.1, setting a new two-heat world record for 3-year-old pacing colts.

10 October 2008 marked another milestone for Shadow Play as he returned a first-up winner over Badlands Nitro in the $275,000 Windy City Pace at Maywood Park. The time of 1:50.4 set a stakes record, lowering the 1:51.3 mark set in the 2007 edition by Booze Cruzin.

== 4 Year Old Campaign ==
After a promising start to his 4-year-old campaign, Shadow Play experienced trouble that put his season in question. It started with sickness in his Molson Pace elimination and was followed by a foot separation in each foot - just over a month apart. One week removed from his latest separation, Shadow Play returned a 14-1 winner in a new best 1:47.4 while holding off Mister Big in the US Pacing Championship at The Meadowlands on 8 August 2009.

== Races ==
	Starts	1st	2nd	3rd	Money	Record
Life	49	20	9	5	$1 549 881	1:47.4
2009	11	3	3	1	$351 250	1:47.4
2008	25	14	3	1	$1 177 421	1:48.2
2007	13	3	3	3	$31 151	1:57.2

Date	Track	Race	Purse	Finish	Fin. Time	Last 1/4	Odds	Driver	Trainer
10 October 2009	Red Mile	ALLERAGE	$149,000	6/1T	1:49.4	27.3	4.80	David Miller	Dr Ian Moore
3 October 2009	Red Mile	ALLERAGE E	$10,000	5/4Q	1:50.2	27.0	2.60	David Miller	Dr Ian Moore
29 September 2009	Red Mile	QUA		1/1	1:52.1	27.3		David Miller	Dr Ian Moore
5 September 2009	Mohawk	CDN DERBY	$500,000	Scratched - Vet (Sick)					
29 August 2009	Mohawk	CDN DERBY E	$50,000	3/1	1:50.2	27.1	*1.20	David Miller	Dr Ian Moore
8 August 2009	The Meadowlands	US PACING	$328,750	1/1T	1:47.4	26.2	14.40	David Miller	Dr Ian Moore
1 August 2009	The Meadowlands	INVITATIONAL	$50 000	2/HD	1:48.4	26.3	2.10	David Miller	Dr Ian Moore
25 July 2009	The Meadowlands	NW26500L5	$27 500	1/NK	1:49.3	28.1	*0.50	David Miller	Dr Ian Moore
19 July 2009	Chester	BEN FRANKLIN E	$50 000	5/1H	1:49.2	26.2	7.70	David Miller	Dr Ian Moore
11 July 2009	Mohawk	OPEN	$50 000	2/2Q	1:50.1	27.4	3.25	Jason Brewer	Dr Ian Moore
28 June 2009	Rideau Carleton	DES SMITH	$162 000	Scratched - Judges					
26 June 2009	Mohawk	QUA		1/7Q	1:52.0	28.0		Paul MacDonell	Dr Ian Moore
20 June 2009	Mohawk	PREFERRED	$40 000	Scratched - Vet (Sick)					
22 May 2009	Western Fair	MOLSON PACE E	$25 000	5/12H	1:54.4	30.3	*0.60	David Miller	Dr Ian Moore
10 May 2009	Mohawk	4YR OPEN	$35 000	1/H	1:51.1	27.1	*0.55	David Miller	Dr Ian Moore
2 May 2009	Charlottetown	QUA		1	1:53.4	28.0		David Miller	Dr Ian Moore
29 November 2008	The Meadowlands	BREEDERS CROWN F	$500 000	2/1T	1:49.0	26.4	4.40	David Miller	Dr Ian Moore
22 November 2008	The Meadowlands	BREEDERS CROWN E	$25 000	1/1Q	1:51.4	26.0	*0.40	David Miller	Dr Ian Moore
1 November 2008	Balmoral Park	AMERICAN NATIONAL	$300,000	1/1	1:49.3	26.1	*0.20	David Miller	Dr Ian Moore
25 October 2008	Yonkers	MESSENGER	$650,000	2/NK	1:52.1	27.4	2.20	David Miller	Dr Ian Moore
10 October 2008	Maywood Park	WINDY CITY	$275,000	1/HD	1:50.4	27.2	*0.70	David Miller	Dr Ian Moore
18 September 2008	Delaware County Fair	LITTLE BROWN JUG F	$264,589	1/6Q	1:50.1	26.2	*0.60	David Miller	Dr Ian Moore
18 September 2008	Delaware County Fair	LITTLE BROWN JUG E	$58 797	1/1H	1:50.0	26.2	1.50	David Miller	Dr Ian Moore
30 August 2008	Mohawk	NW30000L6CD	$29,000	2/NS	1:50.3	27.4	*0.95	David Miller	Dr Ian Moore
17 August 2008	Flamboro	CONFED CUP F	$493,000	5/8H	1:51.0	27.4	4.90	David Miller	Dr Ian Moore
17 August 2008	Flamboro	CONFED CUP E	$50,000	1/2	1:50.2	27.3	*0.75	David Miller	Dr Ian Moore
9 August 2008	Pocono	ADIOS F	$350,000	1/H	1:50.4	29.4	*1.00	David Miller	Mark Ford
1 August 2008	Pocono	ADIOS E	$50,000	1/2	1:48.2	28.1	4.80	David Miller	Mark Ford
25 July 2008	The Meadows	PASS 3YOC&G	$68,121	5/6	1:52.2	29.3	*1.00	David Miller	Mark Ford
19 July 2008	Pocono	NW11500L4	$18 100	1/1T	1:49.4	27.2	*0.20	Tim Tetrick	Mark Ford
8 July 2008	Pocono	REYNOLDS 3YOC	$33 403	1/1Q	1:50.1	27.1	*0.30	David Miller	Mark Ford
1 July 2008	Pocono	PASS 3YOC	$42 553	3/2T	1:50.0	29.0	18.20	David Miller	Mark Ford
21 June 2008	Mohawk	NW3R50000LCD	$22 000	1/8Q	1:50.2	26.1	*0.65	Tim Tetrick	Dr Ian Moore
14 June 2008	Mohawk	NA CUP C	$100 000	7/12T	1:52.0	28.2	73.10	Rick Zeron	Dr Ian Moore
7 June 2008	Mohawk	NA CUP E	$50 000	8/11T	1:51.2	27.3	139.75	Rick Zeron	Dr Ian Moore
31 May 2008	Mohawk	BURLINGTON	$100 000	5/7Q	1:53.0	28.3	19.40	Rick Zeron	Dr Ian Moore
17 May 2008	Pocono	MAX HEMPT E	$37 634	6/8	1:52.4	29.3	11.70	Tim Tetrick	Dr Ian Moore
10 May 2008	Mohawk	DIPLOMAT	$78 000	4/4H	1:52.1	28.3	*0.80	Rick Zeron	Dr Ian Moore
3 May 2008	Mohawk	DIPLOMAT	$25 000	1/T	1:54.2	27.0	*1.20	Rick Zeron	Dr Ian Moore
26 April 2008	Woodbine	DIPLOMAT	$25 000	1/2H	1:52.1	28.1	3.80	Rick Zeron	Dr Ian Moore
19 April 2008	Charlottetown	NW1901L5CD	$2 500	1/13	1:56.0	28.2	*0.15	Dr Ian Moore	Dr Ian Moore
12 April 2008	Charlottetown	QUA		1/14	1:58.0	27.2		Dr Ian Moore	Dr Ian Moore
28 October 2007	Flamboro	NW2R18500L	$6 800	2/1Q	1:57.0	29.3	*0.05	Dr Ian Moore	Dr Ian Moore
20 October 2007	Woodbine	GOV CUP	$23 000	7/9T	1:53.4	27.3	81.00	Paul MacDonell	Dr Ian Moore
23 September 2007	Mohawk	NW2R30000LCD	$17 000	3/T	1:54.2	28.4	1.50	Mark MacDonald	Dr Ian Moore
15 September 2007	Mohawk	NASAGAWEYA	$143 800	8/12T	1:55.2	30.3	3.45	Mark MacDonald	Dr Ian Moore
1 September 2007	Mohawk	METRO F	$1 000 000	6/9T	1:51.3	28.2	37.05	Mark MacDonald	Dr Ian Moore
25 August 2007	Mohawk	METRO E	$40 000	3/4	1:53.0	28.1	4.90	Mark MacDonald	Dr Ian Moore
19 August 2007	Mohawk	NW2R22000LCD	$17 000	3/1	1:53.1	27.2	5.95	Paul MacDonell	Dr Ian Moore
6 August 2007	Mohawk	DREAM MAKER	$56 200	4/2Q	1:54.1	28.1	4.90	Paul MacDonell	Dr Ian Moore
30 July 2007	Mohawk	DREAM MAKER	$15 000	2/1T	1:53.4	30.0	6.50	Dr Ian Moore	Dr Ian Moore
23 July 2007	Mohawk	DREAM MAKER	$15 000	2/Q	1:54.0	27.4	*1.15	Paul MacDonell	Dr Ian Moore
15 July 2007	Mohawk	2YR-C-COND	$15 000	1/H	1:57.2	27.3	*0.65	Dr Ian Moore	Dr Ian Moore
30 June 2007	Charlottetown	NW2RLFTCD	$1 150	1/4H	1:58.0	28.1	*0.25	Dr Ian Moore	Dr Ian Moore
21 June 2007	Charlottetown	NW1RLFT	$1 000	1/4H	2:02.3	29.4	*0.95	Dr Ian Moore	Dr Ian Moore
14 June 2007	Charlottetown	QUA		1/5H	2:03.1	29.2		Dr Ian Moore	Dr Ian Moore

== Breeding Career ==
Shadow Play was retired from racing in October 2009. On January 1, 2010 Blue Chip Farms, the stallion's breeding partner, announced that Shadow Play would stand his first season at stud in Ontario at Winbak Farm. Over his stallion career in Ontario, Shadow Play would go on to sire notable horses such as multiple stake winner Lady Shadow, 2021 Meadowlands Pace and Adios Pace winner Lawless Shadow, 2021 North America Cup winner Desperate Man, as well as the great Bulldog Hanover, the fastest standardbred ever. In November 2002, Blue Chip Farms announced that Shadow Play would be moving to New York where he would stand stud at their Wallkill, NY farm.

== Pedigree ==
Pedigree of Shadow Play
Sire The Panderosa (1996) p,3,1:49.3 ($1,559,822)	Western Hanover	No Nukes	Oil Burner
Sire The Panderosa (1996) p,3,1:49.3 ($1,559,822)	Western Hanover	No Nukes	Gidget Lobell
Sire The Panderosa (1996) p,3,1:49.3 ($1,559,822)	Western Hanover	Wendymae Hanover	Albatross
Sire The Panderosa (1996) p,3,1:49.3 ($1,559,822)	Western Hanover	Wendymae Hanover	Wendy Sue Hanover
Sire The Panderosa (1996) p,3,1:49.3 ($1,559,822)	Daisy Harbor	Coal Harbor	Albatross
Sire The Panderosa (1996) p,3,1:49.3 ($1,559,822)	Daisy Harbor	Coal Harbor	Perna Hanover
Sire The Panderosa (1996) p,3,1:49.3 ($1,559,822)	Daisy Harbor	J R Daisy	Blaze Pick
Sire The Panderosa (1996) p,3,1:49.3 ($1,559,822)	Daisy Harbor	J R Daisy	Rosie Baron
Dam Matts Filly (1994) p,2,1:55.3 ($63,606)	Matt's Scooter	Direct Scooter	Sampson Direct
Dam Matts Filly (1994) p,2,1:55.3 ($63,606)	Matt's Scooter	Direct Scooter	Noble Claire
Dam Matts Filly (1994) p,2,1:55.3 ($63,606)	Matt's Scooter	Ellens Glory	Meadow Skipper
Dam Matts Filly (1994) p,2,1:55.3 ($63,606)	Matt's Scooter	Ellens Glory	Gloria Barmin
Dam Matts Filly (1994) p,2,1:55.3 ($63,606)	Breezes Girl	Warm Breeze	Bret Hanover
Dam Matts Filly (1994) p,2,1:55.3 ($63,606)	Breezes Girl	Warm Breeze	Touch Of Spring
Dam Matts Filly (1994) p,2,1:55.3 ($63,606)	Breezes Girl	Bit Player	Oil Burner
Dam Matts Filly (1994) p,2,1:55.3 ($63,606)	Breezes Girl	Bit Player	Abbe Butler
