= Atlantic Sires Stakes =

- Location: Atlantic Canada
- Inaugurated: 1967 (as the Atlantic Sires Stakes at Brunswick Downs)
- Race type: Standardbred – Flat racing
- Website: Atlantic Sires Stakes

Race information
- Surface: Dirt
- Qualification: Two-year-olds & three-year-olds
- Purse: $52,760 (2025)

The Atlantic Sires Stakes (ATSS) is a category of Canadian standardbred horse races with six divisions held at five tracks across Prince Edward Island and Nova Scotia.

== History ==
=== Founding and early years ===
The Atlantic Colt Stakes Association was organized in 1965 through the collective efforts of horsemen from the Maritimes of Canada. The Atlantic Colt Stakes group elected Gerald Alexander of Sussex, New Brunswick, as its first president on February 6, 1967. The organization elected Glenn Kennedy of Charlottetown as secretary-treasurer and selected one vice-president from each of the four Atlantic provinces: Carl Mackenzie for Nova Scotia, Dr. J. A. Delabey of Moncton for New Brunswick, Elwood Shaw of Charlottetown for P.E.I., and Ron Quinn of St. John's for Newfoundland. The original directors elected were Ingham Palmer Jr., George Woodside, R. R. McCain, Leet Taylor, Percy Arbing, Ralph MacFadyen, James Walsh, Bert Butt, Fred Lahey, Ed Haley, James Ferguson, and Jack Cruickshank.

The Atlantic Sires Stakes added harness racing tracks in Saint John, New Brunswick and Fredericton, giving the association nine tracks to stage its series of stake races.

The Atlantic Sires' Stakes, the first sires' stakes program in Canada, was inaugurated during the 1967 season as a race exclusively for two-year-olds. The inaugural edition was open to horses foaled in 1965. Maritime-bred two-year-olds competed in their first-ever Atlantic Sires Stakes event on August 30, 1967, at Brunswick Downs.

Eligibility was restricted to colts and fillies sired by stallions registered with the association. Before the association and its Atlantic Sires Stakes were established, racing opportunities for maritime-bred three-year-olds were scarce, and those available to two-year-olds were limited to a single event. The Atlantic Sires Stakes extended its eligibility to three-year-olds for the first time in 1968. Among the notable developments of the 1968 season was the scheduling of the first stake designed exclusively for fillies. The association had registered 95 stallions by that time, many drawn from top harness racing bloodlines. The main aim of the events was to improve the quality of maritime-bred horses. The establishment of the stakes program helped build a market in Atlantic Canada for "homebred" stock as local breeders began to realize better prices for their colts and fillies.

During its first campaign in 1967, the Atlantic Sires Stakes provided horsemen with more than $10,000 in purse money. The 1968 purse money stood at $28,040, while purses increased by over $11,000 for the 1969 season. The Maritime industry developed into a three-province circuit, racing nearly every week at major tracks across the region with purses averaging just over $1,000.

The annual executive meeting of the Atlantic Sires Stakes was held in conjunction with the annual meeting, reception, and banquet of District 10 of the United States Trotting Association, covering the Maritime provinces and Newfoundland. Awards for the stake's winners were presented at the banquet.

=== Expansion and development ===
After establishing a sales committee in 1969, the Maritime Colt Stakes Association held its first annual sale in September of that year. The sale featured maritime-bred yearlings and weanlings. Yearlings from top maritime sires were put up for auction, with each horse sold becoming eligible to enter the stakes. The sale was first organized in Shediac, later held in Truro until 1976, and then conducted in Fredericton.

The Maritime Provinces Colt Stakes Association Ltd. had established filly divisions in the 1974 Atlantic Sires Stakes program, with fillies competing separately from colts. The stakes are open to 2- and 3-year-old pacing and trotting colts and fillies sired by stallions registered with the Atlantic Sires Stakes program in the relevant breeding year. Divisions include 3-year-old pacing colts, 3-year-old pacing fillies, 3-year-old trotters, and 2-year-old pacing colts, 2-year-old pacing fillies, and 2-year-old trotters.

=== Modern era ===
By the mid-1970s, the sponsoring group operated under the name Atlantic Standardbred Breeders Association (ASBA).

The championship races of the Atlantic Sires Stakes and those of other series became part of the Atlantic Breeders Crown Championships in October 1999, with every final held on the same program. The inaugural event took place at Truro Raceway. Eligibility for the Atlantic Breeders Crown Championships is based on points accumulated in Atlantic Sires Stakes A division events.

Since the 1960s, the provincial governments of Nova Scotia and Prince Edward Island subsidize their sires' stakes program, while the Government of New Brunswick pulled out in 2011. Participating tracks from Prince Edward Island are Summerside Raceway, Inverness Raceway, and Charlottetown Driving Park. Nova Scotia's tracks in the program are Northside Downs and Truro Raceway.

== See also ==
- Charlottetown Driving Park
- Truro Raceway
- Summerside Raceway
