= Splashdot =

SplashDot
- Industry: Online Marketing and Software
- Founded: 2000
- Founders: Patrick Watson & Jonathan Csakany
- Headquarters: Vancouver, British Columbia, Canada
- Area served: Global
- Products: Online loyalty programs, promotions, games, polls, surveys, email marketing.
- Website: https://www.splashdot.com/

Splashdot is a privately held company based in Vancouver. The company provides online loyalty programs and interactive promotions using gamification techniques, and powered by their software platform, nCentive. Founded in 2000 by Jonathan Csakany, President, and Patrick Watson, CEO, SplashDot progressed from offering user-generated content services to specializing in online customer loyalty and promotional programs.

By 2007, Splashdot was working with 75% of Canada's gaming jurisdictions including Ontario Lottery and Gaming Corporation, Atlantic Lottery Corporation, Great Canadian Gaming, and other non-gaming organizations such as WestJet, Kraft Foods and Bell Canada.

In 2012, opened up its second office on Montreal, Quebec, Canada.
