= Dan Patch Trainer of the Year Award =

Dan Patch Awards
- Awarded for: American Harness Racing
- Country: United States
- Presented by: United States Harness Writers Association (USHWA)
- First award: 1985
- Website: USHWA website

The Dan Patch Trainer of the Year Award is an annual award created in 1985 by members of the United States Harness Writers Association (USHWA). The Association's website states that their members' determination is aided by input from the American Harness Racing Secretaries plus logistic expertise provided by the United States Trotting Association.

The award winner receives the Glen Garnsey Trophy, named in honor of the Hall of Fame trainer who died at the zenith of his career at age 52 in 1985 as the result of an automobile accident.

There are several categories of USHWA Dan Patch Award named for the legendary pacer Dan Patch (1896-1916).

Past winners:

- 2023: Ake Svanstedt
- 2022 Jim Campbell
- 2021 Richard "Nifty" Norman
- 2020 Nancy Takter
- 2019 Marcus Melander
- 2018 Ron Burke
- 2017 Brian Brown
- 2016 Jimmy Takter
- 2015 : Jimmy Takter
- 2014 : Jimmy Takter
- 2013 : Ronald J. Burke
- 2012 : Linda Toscano
- 2011 : Ronald J. Burke
- 2010 : Jimmy Takter
- 2009 : Gregory B. Peck
- 2008 : Ray Schnittker
- 2007 : Steve Elliott
- 2006 : Mickey Burke
- 2005 : Ervin M. Miller
- 2004 : Trond Smedshammer
- 2003 : Ivan Sugg
- 2002 : Jim Doherty
- 2001 : Robert McIntosh
- 2000 : Mark Ford / Jimmy Takter
- 1999 : Ron Gurfein
- 1998 : Brett Pelling
- 1997 : William Wellwood
- 1996 : Jimmy Takter
- 1995 : Joe Holloway
- 1994 : Carl Allen
- 1993 : William G. Robinson
- 1992 : Robert McIntosh
- 1991 : Per Eriksson
- 1990 : Gene Riegle / Bruce Nickells
- 1989 : Richard Stillings / Harry J. Poulton
- 1988 : Steve Elliott
- 1987 : Charles "Chuck" Sylvester
- 1986 : Soren Nordin
- 1985 : Charles "Chuck" Sylvester

== See also ==
- Eclipse Award for Outstanding Trainer
