= Tartan Downs =

Former horse racing course in Sydney, Nova Scotia

Coordinates: 46°8′28″N 60°9′53″W

- Interactive map of Tartan Downs
- Location: Sydney, Nova Scotia, Canada
- Date opened: 1898
- Date closed: 2006
- Course type: Harness racing (half-mile dirt oval)

Tartan Downs was a Canadian harness racing track located in Sydney, Nova Scotia, Canada.

== History ==
=== North Sydney Trotting Park ===
Canadian newspapermen A. C. Bertram, of the North Sydney Herald, and R. Hickey established a horse racing venture in Sydney, Nova Scotia, in the late 1890s. The early announcements were advertised in the Halifax Herald, and sports editors of the city papers were invited to be in attendance. Known as North Sydney Trotting Park, the track opened on July 31, 1898. The original executive officers of the association were President A. C. Bertram and Secretary R. Hickey, with a board including Dr. L. W. Johnstone, R. Musgrave, Dr. H. Kindress, M. J. Ross, Norman Gentle, and M. W. Lawlor. The half-mile oval was located on a hill close to the home of Hon. George Henry Murray, then Premier of Nova Scotia. The North Sydney Driving Association managed the track and organized speed contests among the top horses in the Maritime provinces. The track hosted two racing meetings each year, one in summer and another in autumn.

Cape Breton sportsman Charles Ballard purchased the North Sydney Trotting Park in 1930. He improved the oval and added a 25-stall stable, a judges' stand, a grandstand, and a fence surrounding the track.

=== Cape Breton Sports Centre ===
During the summer of 1945, the old trotting park became the Cape Breton Sports Centre. 40 new stables, including 20 winterized units, were built to the left of the Prince Street entrance near a new paddock area where drivers could exercise their horses. A grandstand with a canopy roof and capacity for 2,400 was also built. Joe O'Brien of Prince Edward Island oversaw the construction of the half-mile oval, which was finished in mid-July 1945. The refurbished track officially opened on August 1, 1945.

The Cape Breton Turf Club managed the track during the early 1950s. The Cape Breton Sports Centre went bankrupt in April 1952 due to debts exceeding $47,000. Shareholders refused the Turf Club's $30,000 bid for the property. The bankrupt Cape Breton Sports Centre Limited joined with the Cape Breton Turf Club in May 1952 to operate the racing oval for the season. By 1955, creditors had taken hold of Cape Breton Sports Centre Limited. To settle outstanding debts and reopen the track for the 1957 season, the club raised more than $3,000 in contributions from local businesses and supporters. In 1958, 51 harness racing events produced $650,000 in pari-mutuel bets, setting a record for Cape Breton horse racing. Under the Bankruptcy Act, the Cape Breton racing plant went up for auction. 11 businessmen, all creditors of the sports centre, turned down a $67,000 offer in January 1959, agreeing to partner with the 18-member Cape Breton Turf Club to operate the $120,000 track. Alongside Sackville Downs near Halifax, it was one of Nova Scotia's two largest tracks that year.

By the 1970s, the Cape Breton Sports Centre participated in the Atlantic Sires Stakes series, remaining involved until the track closed.

=== Tartan Downs ===
The racing facility was renamed Tartan Downs in 1984. The Tartan Downs racetrack, situated on Upper Prince Street, covered 24 acres.

After the Sydney harness racing track accumulated substantial debt, the Government of Nova Scotia intervened in 1990 to provide a $3.3 million bailout. As part of the arrangement, the province converted its loans into shares and issued a $994,500 loan to clear back taxes. The Maritime Racing Commission acquired 60% of the shares in Tartan Downs on December 5, 1994, taking control of the track. Don MacLellan, former manager of Inverness Raceway, was appointed to oversee operations. The racetrack in Cape Breton declared bankruptcy after racking up debts of close to $1.6 million, owing the city of Sydney nearly $500,000 in back taxes and the Nova Scotia government another $1 million.

When Tartan Downs entered receivership in late 1994, former horseman Jack MacNeil purchased the track in 1995 from the City of Sydney for about $300,000.

== Closure ==
Tartan Downs closed in May 2006 and did not host races that season. The maritime oval continued to stable racehorses and operate as a training track after 2006 until the site was sold. The grandstand was taken down in October 2012. The Tartan Downs property was listed for sale in 2018. In the fall of 2019, the former track was purchased by Cape Breton University to develop multi-unit student housing. A 24-acre portion of the property was donated by Cape Breton University for development purposes. Under its new ownership, the grounds closed to horses and their owners on December 31, 2019.

== Track records ==
Time	Horse	Date	Driver	Notes
2:19	Minota	1899	—	
1:02¾	Calumet Brownie	September 21, 1933	Billy Hood	Fastest single heat
2:06 4/5	Eben's Ace	October 19, 1961	Sonny Rankin	

== See also ==
- List of horse racing venues
- Sackville Downs
