= Brunswick Downs =

Former harness racing track in Dieppe, New Brunswick

- Location: Dieppe, New Brunswick, Canada
- Date opened: 1903
- Date closed: 1991
- Course type: Harness racing (dirt oval)

Brunswick Downs was a harness racing track in Dieppe, New Brunswick, Canada, near Moncton.

== History ==
=== Moncton Speedway ===
The Moncton Exhibition Association Company, a member of the National Trotting Association, established a new speedway in 1903. The official opening of the Moncton Speedway was held on October 2, 1903. It was one of the principal horse racing centres in New Brunswick. The track was under lease to the Moncton Exhibition Association, a company of local businessmen, until the early 1930s. Instead of cancelling the lease, the Moncton Exhibition Association Ltd. was to transfer to the city that portion of the property known as the Speedway.

The establishment of an athletic field within the Speedway oval with facilities for all branches of outdoor sport was proposed in 1934. The speedway had been leased to the newly organized Moncton Playgrounds Association by 1935, which erected a fence around the field.

At the onset of World War II, the Department of National Defence purchased the Moncton Speedway property from the City of Moncton, taking over its operating lease. On January 31, 1940, the property was transferred to the Defence Department, later being used by the Royal Canadian Air Force supply depot. For several years Moncton Speedway had been used as an airport until the mid-1940s. After the airfield was abandoned during World War II, the property was converted for harness racing.

=== Moncton Raceway ===
During early 1945, local sportsmen formed the Moncton Raceway Limited to construct and operate a new racing plant on the site of the old Léger Corner airport. The first annual meeting of the Moncton Raceway Company was held on March 12, 1945. Frank Ryder was appointed president; George Gay, Lester Wheaton, and Ambrose Wheeler as vice presidents; Ronald Dickie as secretary; Jerome Moriss as assistant secretary; A. Temple Doyle as treasurer; and Charles Clark as racing secretary.

A new sportscentre was established as Moncton Raceway from 1946 to 1962. The grand opening event of the Moncton Raceway took place with two days of racing from July 24 to July 25, 1946. The following year, the track hosted the inaugural Monctonian, which offered a $5,000 purse and attracted an estimated crowd of 12,000.

By 1963, the main shareholders of Moncton Raceway Company Limited were Walter Cluff, Les Stiles, and Ev Ryder. In the previous 1962 season, the track had been leased to a group of Moncton businessmen headed by Jean Cadieux under the name Hub Raceway Limited, which later acquired both the operating lease and its assets.

=== Brunswick Downs ===
Moncton Raceway Limited was purchased from Ernest O'Brien, who had taken over Moncton Raceway from Otty Stevenson, a once prominent Saint John sports entrepreneur. The racing facility was renamed and called Brunswick Downs from 1963 to 1981. During the winter of 1962, a company was formed by a group of businessmen that bought out Moncton Raceway on February 2, 1963. Ingham Palmer Jr., a former radio announcer in Saint John and track announcer at Saint John's Exhibition Park, served as president and general manager. F. Gordon MacLeod served as vice president and E. A. Keyes as secretary-treasurer. The original directors included J. A. Keefe, J. Edward Murphy, Harvey Hicks, and Ingham Palmer Sr.

It was one of three major tracks in New Brunswick, including the Fredericton Raceway and Saint John's Exhibition Park. Brunswick Downs was billed as the Maritimes' "most progressive raceway." The improvements made that year included a new mobile starting gate, an improved track lighting system, a new streamlined tote board, improved pari-mutuel facilities, a new past performance type scorecard, and improved facilities for horsemen and fans. 70 of the 101 stalls at Brunswick Downs acquired new roofs and floors.

The inaugural card of its first season under the new management was staged on June 15, 1963. Around 1,500 harness racing fans were in attendance at the renovated oval where Mayor Leonard C. Jones Jr. cut the ribbon for its official opening during a pre-race ceremony.

Brunswick Downs also hosted an early meeting of the Atlantic Sires Stakes in 1967, during the inaugural season of Canada's first sires stakes program.

Brunswick Downs closed after an arson fire destroyed its grandstand on August 31, 1981. The closure left Greater Moncton without a raceway until the track reopened three years later under a different name.

=== Champlain Raceway ===
A newly constructed harness racing facility was later rebuilt on the same site as Brunswick Downs and opened as the Champlain Raceway. The grand opening took place on October 27, 1984. It was the only New Brunswick track under the jurisdiction of the United States Trotting Association and the only five-eighths mile track in the Maritimes.

Champlain Raceway, a multi-million dollar facility operated by Hub Raceway Ltd., was the only privately owned harness racetrack out of the province's three raceways. After four years of operating in a deficit position, it was placed in receivership under a large debt load, high operating costs, and low wagering and attendance in the fall of 1988. The receivers, Coopers & Lybrand of Saint John, operated the track until April 1989. It was closed and sold at public auction to the National Bank of Canada, the principal creditor.

=== New Brunswick Downs ===
When the Champlain Raceway ran into its financial troubles in 1989, it was purchased by Peter Cattoni, a Swiss native living in Rexton, New Brunswick, and his two partners. Along with Arnold Gerhard, Cattoni reopened in June 1989 after pouring hundreds of thousands of their own capital into the racing plant. The group reopened the failed Champlain Raceway as New Brunswick Downs, operating the facility until its closing on October 26, 1991. Peter Cattoni, the company's president, closed New Brunswick Downs, citing economic reasons.

Part of the steel framework from the former racing stands was later incorporated into a fire station that opened on the property in 2004. The site was formally recognized on the municipal register of Local Historic Places on November 14, 2006.

== See also ==
- List of horse racing venues
- Sackville Downs
