= Heather Vitale =

Personal details
- Occupation: Journalist

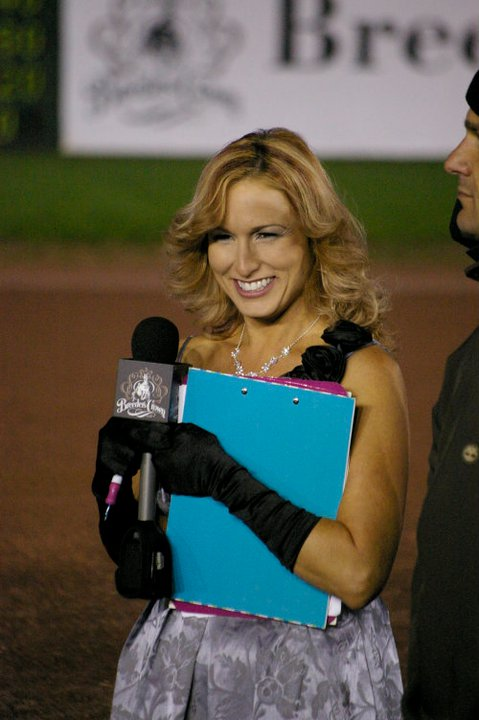
Heather Vitale broadcasting at The Downs at Mohegan Sun Pocono in Pennsylvania during Breeders Crown in 2010.

Heather Vitale is a television journalist for the sport of Standardbred horse racing (harness racing).

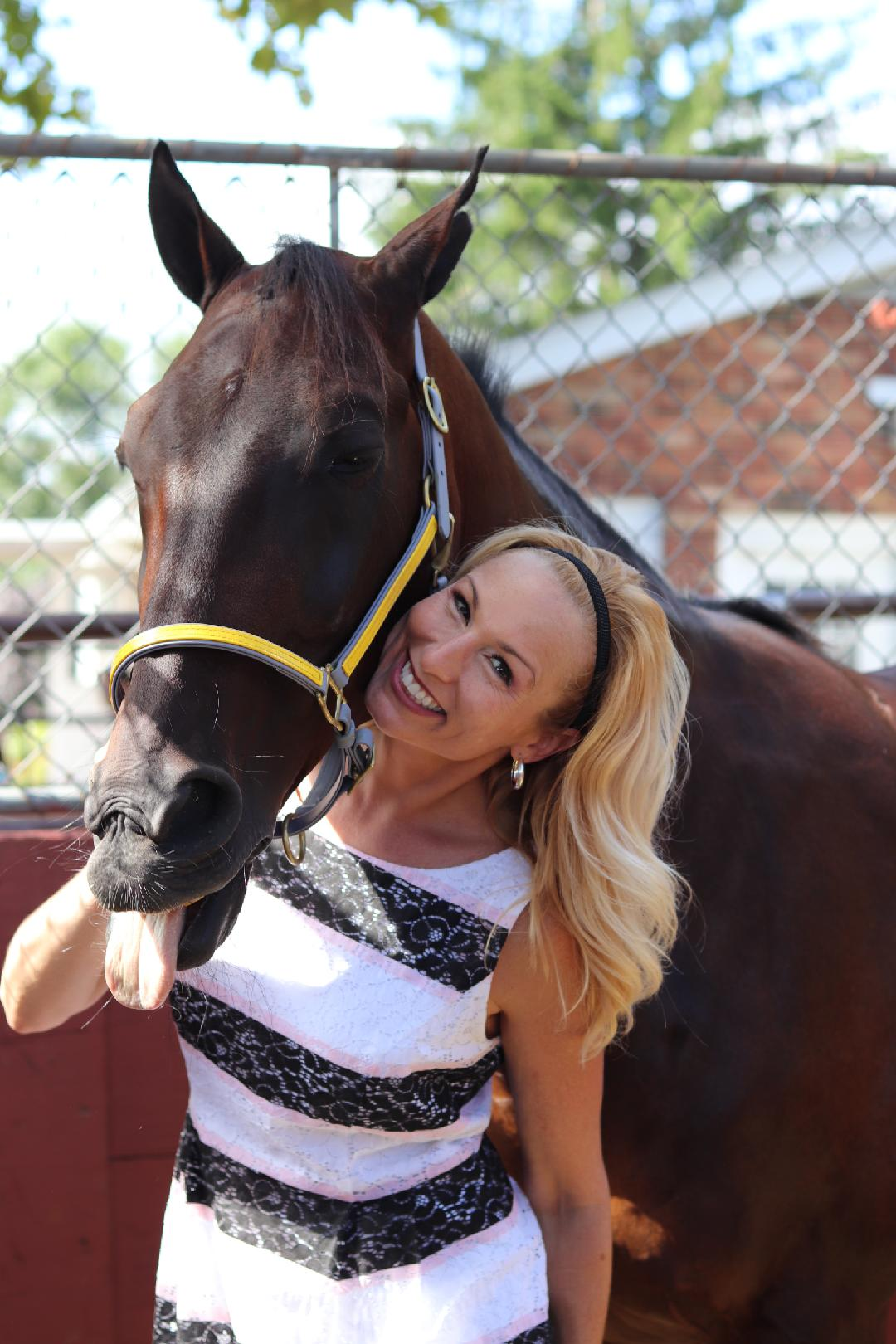
Heather Vitale with Foiled Again, richest Standardbred in history, at Open Space Pace at Freehold Raceway (New Jersey) in 2018.

== Education ==
A graduate of Monmouth University (New Jersey) in 1994, Vitale graduated cum laude with Bachelor of Arts. She had major in Public Relations and a minor in Journalism.

== Career ==
Vitale is the host of POST TIME, which airs on the CBS affiliate WBOC-TV in Delaware, Maryland and Virginia. She has been a part of the weekly half-hour show about harness racing since its inception (July 1998). From 2008 until 2015 she has co-hosted PA HARNESS WEEK, a weekly Comcast Philadelphia program. Vitale has continued to host PA Harness Week when it revised the program on NBC Sports Philadelphia in 2018.

Vitale has covered harness racing nationally. In 1997, she was part of the espn2 broadcasting team for The American Championship Harness Racing Series. In 2010, Vitale was the paddock correspondent on MAV-TV during the live Breeders Crown event at The Downs at Mohegan Sun Pocono. In 2011, she was on the live Breeders Crown broadcast team for MAV-TV and The Score (Canadian sports channel).

Vitale also covers harness racing outside of the United States. Years 2014 through 2018, she was an on-air reporter for The Vincent Delaney Memorial at Portmarnock Raceway in Ireland. She also traveled to Perth, Australia in December 2014 to report on the Inter Dominion at Gloucester Park. On Inter Dominion Day she reported from the paddock during the live national broadcast across Australia.

She was part of the broadcast team for the national Little Brown Jug shows airing on CBS Sports in 2014 and 2015.

Vitale visited New Zealand to cover the New Zealand Cup in 2018 and 2019, as well as the Kaikoura Trotting Cup in 2019 to report on harness racing. She made appearances on the national television show Seven Sharp and the local news broadcast 1News for the Christchurch and Canterbury area of New Zealand.

Vitale also covered Standardbred racing in Paris during the 2020 Prix d'Amerique.

In recent years Vitale has been a social media correspondent for Harness Racing Update and many events including The International Trot in New York and race meets at Shenandoah Downs in Virginia.

== Awards ==
2001 - Hervey Broadcasting Excellence Award for best Harness Racing Television Show (Post Time)

2004 - Clyde Hirt Memorial Media Award from Harness Horsemen International

2014 - Double winner at the United States Harness Writers Association (USHWA) Dan Patch Awards

2018 - Alan Prince United States Harness Writers Association Member of the Year Award
