= NSGC =

NSGC may stand for:

- National Society of Genetic Counselors
- Nova Scotia Gaming Corporation
