= Dan Patch Rising Star Award =

The Dan Patch Rising Star Award is an annual award created in 1986 by members of the United States Harness Writers Association (USHWA). The award recognizes the exceptional early accomplishments of a young harness horse trainer and/or driver. The association's website states that their members' determination is aided by input from the American Harness Racing Secretaries plus logistic expertise provided by the United States Trotting Association.

The Dan Patch Rising Star Award is one of several categories in the Dan Patch Award program named for the legendary pacer Dan Patch (1896-1916).

Past winners:

- 2023 : Jay Hochstetler
- 2022 : Lucas Wallin
- 2021 : Todd McCarthy
- 2020 : N/A
- 2019 : Bob McClure
- 2018 : Marcus Melander
- 2017 : Trace Tetrick
- 2016 : Marcus Miller
- 2015 : Montrell Teague
- 2014 : Nancy Johansson
- 2013 : Corey Callahan
- 2012 : Scott Zeron
- 2011 : Dan Noble
- 2010 : Matt Kakaley
- 2009 : Jordan Stratton
- 2008 : Jason Bartlett
- 2007 : Tim Tetrick
- 2006 : Jody Jamieson
- 2005 : Mark MacDonald
- 2004 : Pat Lachance
- 2003 : Yannick Gingras
- 2002 : Jeff Gregory
- 2001 : Brett Miller
- 2000 : Stéphane Bouchard
- 1999 : Eric Ledford
- 1998 : Robert Stewart
- 1997 : Daniel Dubé
- 1996 : George Brennan
- 1995 : Liz Quesnel
- 1994 : Jack Baggit, Jr.
- 1993 : David Miller
- 1992 : Luc Ouellette
- 1991 : Brian Sears
- 1990 : Jerry Riordan
- 1989 : Kenneth Seeber
- 1988 : Brian Allen
- 1987 : Joseph Essig, Jr.
- 1986 : Richard Silverman
