= Montrell Teague =

American harness racing driver (born 1991)

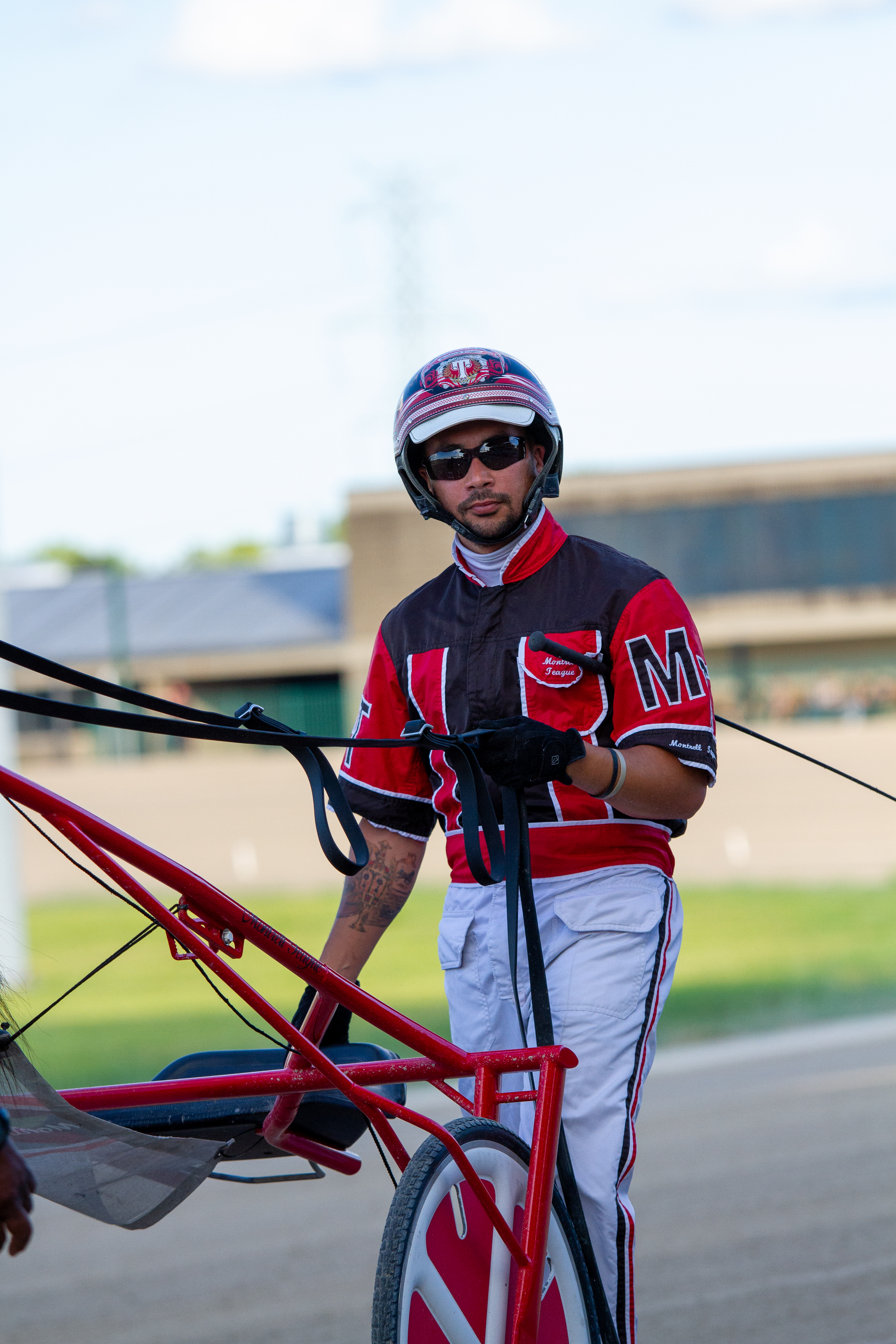
- Teague in 2024

Personal information
- Born: January 2, 1991 (age 35) United States

Horse racing career
- Sport: Horse racing
- Career wins: 2,337 (as of July 17, 2024)

Major racing wins
- Little Brown Jug (2015); Meadowlands Pace (2015); Canadian Pacing Derby (2016); North America Cup (2018)

Racing awards
- 2015 Rising Star Award

Significant horses
- Wiggle It Jiggleit, Lather Up
- Updated on July 17, 2024

Montrell Teague (born January 2, 1991) is an American harness racing driver. He won the 2015 Dan Patch Rising Star Award at the age of 24 after winning the Little Brown Jug and Meadowlands Pace with 2015 Harness Horse of the Year Wiggle It Jiggleit. He is also noted for becoming the youngest driver to win a major stakes race at Hoosier Park in 2011 at the age of 20.

== Personal life ==
Teague is a Delaware native, the son of well known horseman George Teague Jr., who owns Teague Stable and Farm in Harrington, Delaware. His father started to teach him to drive when he was about 10 years old.

== Racing career ==
Teague races mainly at Harrington Raceway, Dover Downs, and Harrah's Philadelphia. In 2010, he won two $100,000 Delaware Standardbred Breeders Fund championships with No Bad Luck. In 2011, he scored his first major win in the $300,000 Max Hempt Memorial with Custard the Dragon, owned and trained by his father. The two later won the $500,000 Hoosier Cup, making Teague the youngest driver to ever win a major stakes race at Hoosier Park.

In 2015, he reached national prominence for his partnership with Wiggle It Jiggleit, earning Teague the Dan Patch Rising Star Award. The highlight of the year was their victory in the Little Brown Jug, widely considered to be one of the greatest harness races of all time. "I had a guy come up to me a few days later at (Harrah's Philadelphia) and he said 'I've been watching harness racing for 50 years and I want to say thank you for giving me the thrill of my lifetime, to watch the best race I've ever seen.' I never would have expected that," recalled Teague in a later interview. The pair's other wins included the Meadowlands Pace, Carl Milstein Memorial Pace, Matron Male Stakes and Hap Hansen Progress Pace.

In 2016, Teague continued to travel around North America with Wiggle It Jiggleit, with major wins including the Dan Patch Stakes at Hoosier Park and Canadian Pacing Derby at Mohawk Racetrack. "A lot of horses can't travel around like that and still race good," said Teague. "He's the exception. I've never seen it done. It hasn't bothered him yet. Harrington is his home, but we've only raced him there once. It seems like everywhere has been his home track. When people know he is racing at their track, they try to make it out there to see him live."

Teague earned his 1,000th career win with Henry The Dragon on September 27, 2016 in a $20,000 division of the Delaware Standardbred Breeders Fund stakes.

In 2018, Teague won the Pepsi North America Cup for the first time with Lather Up. As the horse's main driver, he won the William R. Haughton Memorial, the Dan Patch Stakes, and the Ohio Sires Stakes final, among others. He also became the second driver to win a race in 1:46 when he and Lather Up won the Graduate Series Final in 2019.

As of 2024, Teague has won more than 2,300 races and earnings of more than $34 million.
