= Hempstead Plains =

Grassland region in Nassau County, New York

The Hempstead Plains is a region of central Long Island in what is now Nassau County in New York State. It was once an open expanse of native grassland estimated to extend to about 60,000 acres (240 km^{2}; 94 sq mi). It is separated from the North Shore of Long Island by the Harbor Hill Moraine, later approximately Route 25. The modern Hempstead Turnpike approximates the separation of the plain from the South Shore of Long Island. The east–west extent was from somewhat west of the modern Queens, New York City, border to slightly beyond the Suffolk County border.

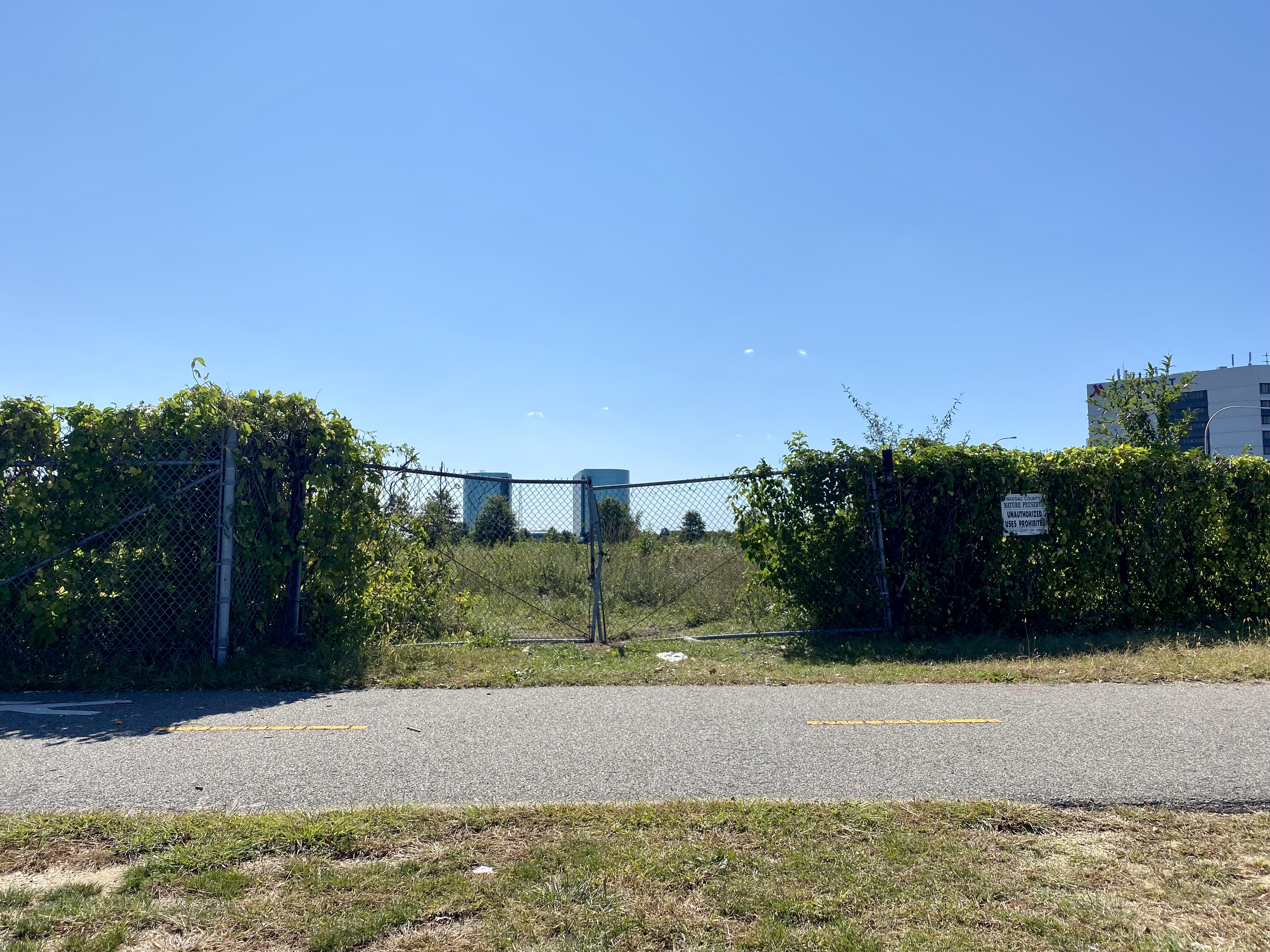
The Francis T. Purcell Preserve in October 2021. Located in Uniondale, this preserve is one of the largest undisturbed areas of the Hempstead Plains.

The Town of Hempstead, now America's most populous civil township, was first settled by Europeans around 1644. Although the settlers were from the English colony of Connecticut, a patent was issued by Dutch New Netherland after the settlers had purchased land from the local Native Americans. The town may have been named for either Hemel Hempstead in England, or the city of Heemstede in North Holland.

In early US history, the Hempstead Plains region was cited as one of the few natural prairies east of the Allegheny Mountains. Long Island historians George Dade and Frank Strand wrote that it was created by an outwash of glacial sediment more than ten thousand years ago. The result was vast, flat open land.

The site is considered highly ecologically and historically significant. The Hempstead Plains supports populations of federally endangered and globally rare plants among its 250 different kinds of vegetation as well as several plant species that are now considered rare in New York State. It represents one of the most rapidly vanishing habitats in the world, along with scores of birds, butterflies, and other animals that are vanishing with it.

== Horse racing ==
Horse racing in the United States and on the North American continent dates back to the establishment of the Newmarket Course on the Salisbury Plains section of the Hempstead Plains of Long Island in 1665. This first racing meet in North America was supervised by New York's colonial governor, Richard Nicolls. The area is now occupied by the present Nassau County region of Greater Westbury and Garden City.

The year 1905 saw the opening of Belmont Park on part of the western edge of the Hempstead Plains. Its mile and a half main track is the largest dirt Thoroughbred race course in the world, and it has the sport's largest grandstand.

The South Westbury section of the plains is (appropriately) known as Salisbury, and Nassau County's largest park (more than 800 acres (3 km²)) was established in the region as Salisbury Park in the 1940s, on the site of the former Salisbury Golf Links. The county facility has been known as Eisenhower Park since 1971.

Even during the later era of air flight activity on the Hempstead Plains, part of the east section of privately owned Roosevelt Field became Roosevelt Raceway, first a popular auto-racing site and then the pioneering standardbred track in horse racing, from 1940 to its closing in 1988.

== Aviation ==
Another pioneering industry on the Hempstead Plains was aviation. In July 1909, aviator and manufacturer Glenn Curtiss relocated his base of operation from his native upstate New York to Mineola. Curtiss, at the controls of his biplane the Golden Flyer, circled the plains' Washington Avenue field for more than 52 minutes, demonstrating the aircraft's capabilities and earning the Scientific American prize for a flight of more than 25 kilometres (16 mi).

Some 15 years later, the Hempstead Plains had earned the appellation "Cradle of Aviation". The Hempstead Plains Aerodrome was renamed to in 1917 to Hazelhurst Field, and again in 1918 to Roosevelt Field on the eastern half, and Curtiss Field to the west. These facilities and Mitchel Field provided the eastern United States' hub of private, and even military, air activity.

The most famous flight from the Hempstead Plains was Charles Lindbergh's 1927 journey to France. On May 20-May 21, Lindbergh, aboard the single-engine monoplane Spirit of St. Louis, was the first pilot to fly from the U.S. solo and nonstop across the Atlantic Ocean, flying from Roosevelt Field to Le Bourget, Paris, in 33½ hours. (His grandson Erik Lindbergh repeated this trip in 2002, 75 years later, in 17 hours 17 minutes.)

== Development and preservation ==
With the mid-century period came suburbanization and commercial development of the Plains region. The west section of Roosevelt Field (once known as Curtiss Field before its 1929 merger with Roosevelt) ceased operations in 1951 and has been occupied since 1956 by the Roosevelt Field Mall, one of the world's largest indoor shopping centers.

To the east, the former Roosevelt Raceway section is occupied by a multiplex cinema, Target department store, and luxury condominiums. The section north of the raceway, development on which dates back to the 1960s, is occupied by The Source Mall anchored by Costco (and formerly by the flagship of the Fortunoff department stores).

Mitchel Field, which includes the Hempstead Plains site formerly known as Camp Mills, housed an Air Force base until 1961 and is currently used for multiple sites, including the Cradle of Aviation Museum, Nassau Community College, Nassau Veterans Memorial Coliseum, and some of the housing and recreational facilities for Hofstra University.

The last remaining few acres of untouched Hempstead Plains ground exist:

- Hempstead Plains Preserve near Nassau Community College, immediately adjacent to the power plant and directly behind the Long Island Marriott. 40°43′44″N 73°35′8″W
- In the area behind The Wheatley School (the high school of the East Williston School District in Old Westbury), known as the Wheatley Woods for the trees that hide the acres of plains. 40°45′49″N 73°36′46″W
- In the plains in Eisenhower Park 40°43′57″N 73°34′35″W
- In the plains which stretch east to the Suffolk County border
- In several acres in Plainview; the existing area was slated to be an extension of the Bethpage State Parkway which was not built, and the land was never developed
