= GeoLotto =

Online gambling companies of the United Kingdom

- Region: United Kingdom
- Launched: 2010
- Operator: Geo24 UK
- Regulated by: UK Gambling Commission
- Highest jackpot: £1,000,000
- Odds of winning a prize: 1 in 19.265

GeoLotto (previously known as GeoSweep) was a privately owned, online, map-based lottery game operating in the United Kingdom.

== History ==
GeoLotto, formerly known as Geosweep, was created in 2010 by London based technology company, Geonomics. The idea started with brothers Henry and James Oakes who secured funding for a prototype location-based betting website, later funded by a £2 million investment.

Tipp24, a publicly listed company and lottery specialist, invested a significant amount into the product in 2012.

In 2013 it was revealed that the Atlantic Lottery Corporation spent nearly C$2 million promoting Geosweep before cancelling the game. Despite having a "daily $250,000 prize" no one ever won it in over a year of draws. Geosweep's parent company was paid $8.7 million.

== Eligibility ==
- Players must be at least 18 years old to play.
- The games may only be played by residents of the UK.
- The games were exclusively web-based, requiring a web browser to play.

== Current games ==
Games that operate under the GeoLotto brand:

=== Geo Lottery game ===
Geo Lottery is the flagship product of the site. This is a globe game where you select a specific location(lucky spot) on the globe. The globe is rotated on random direction and with random power after which it settles on a point. You will be selected as a winner if the location you had chosen falls within a certain radius from the point where the globe had settled.

=== GeoLotto game ===
Usually referred to simply as 'GeoLotto', this game was the flagship product of the site. The premise of the game was that a player could select squares to own out of a grid of squares overlaid onto a satellite representation of Great Britain (the map data was served by Google Maps). Each square had an equal probability chance to win one of the various prizes assigned randomly at the end of the game. A square was valued at £1 a week. The draw conducted every Saturday at 10.30pm, with the results announced at 11pm.

Players could enter by paying for a square for a fixed number of weeks or they could subscribe for ongoing entry until they decide to cancel.

== Regulation ==
GeoLotto was regulated by the UK Gambling Commission, certified by GamCare and carried the 'Verified by Norton' tag.
