= Stephen G. Phillips =

American harness racing official and inventor (1887–1973)

- Born: Stephen Gabriel Phillips; 1887; Xenia, Ohio, U.S.
- Died: September 26, 1973 (aged 85–86); Xenia, Ohio, U.S.
- Resting place: Woodlawn Cemetery
- Other name: Steve Phillips
- Occupations: Starting judge; Inventor
- Employer: Roosevelt Raceway
- Known for: Phillips' mobile starting gate
- Relatives: Stephen C. Phillips (uncle)
- Honors: United States Harness Racing Hall of Fame (1962)

Stephen G. Phillips (1887 – September 26, 1973) was an American harness racing official and inventor who developed the mobile starting gate. He was inducted into the Harness Racing Museum & Hall of Fame in 1962.

== Early life ==
Stephen Gabriel Phillips was born in 1887 in Xenia, Ohio, United States. He was born into a family of noted horsemen. He was a nephew of Stephen C. Phillips, a Hall of Fame harness race driver-trainer.

== Career ==
Phillips got his start in harness racing, serving as a race starter at the annual county fair in Xenia, Ohio. He began officiating on the Grand Circuit in 1917. He held the role of starting judge on the Grand Circuit for 26 years. The inaugural 1926 Hambletonian Stakes in Syracuse, New York featured Phillips as its starter. He was the official starter at Roosevelt Raceway and Yonkers Raceway and had officiated at many of the sport's major harness races. He worked on over 100 tracks throughout the United States.

=== Mobile starting gate ===
Phillips revolutionized the sport of harness racing by introducing the first successful mobile starting gate. After seeing camera equipment fastened to a truck to film trotters at Lexington, Kentucky, in 1931, the former driver-trainer spent several years working on a mobile unit. He developed, in 1937, a moving automobile with a folding contraption mounted on the back that maintains horses side by side toward the starting line. In July 1937, he demonstrated his first gate, built on a 1930 Ford chassis, at North Randall, Ohio, but Grand Circuit officials refused its use during races until further approval.

After consulting George Morton Levy, Robert G. Johnson, and J. Alfred Valentine, controlling officials at Roosevelt Raceway, Phillips gained authorization to build an improved starting gate. Following his move to New York in 1940, he refined his invention at the Liberty Aircraft Corporation, devising a folding arm to close the 70-foot wings once the race began. It was built at a cost of $53,000 at the Long Island plant. His improved mobile starting gate first appeared at Roosevelt Raceway in Long Island, New York, in May 1946. The elimination of false starts made it an instant success. His U.S. patent application was filed on July 18, 1946. He was granted the patent on the Phillips' starting gate on February 14, 1950. Within three years of its introduction, his invention was adopted by most major harness tracks in the United States. Its use extended to Yonkers Raceway for the Hambletonian, to Reading, Pennsylvania, for the Reading Fair Futurity, and to The Red Mile for the Kentucky Futurity. In an interview with Arthur Daley of The New York Times, he said he got the idea from watching a film crew record a race.

In 1959, it was ruled that Phillips, as a starter employed by a track, could not hold a financial interest in Roosevelt Raceway, Inc. He ended his 50-year career as a starter in 1960. His final appearance at Roosevelt Raceway was on September 28, 1960. Before his retirement, Phillips started an average of 1,900 races during a season. After he retired, his son Charles "Chuck" Phillips took over operating the starting gate at Roosevelt Raceway.

== Death ==
Stephen G. Phillips died on September 26, 1973, in Xenia, Ohio, United States, at 86. He was interred in Woodlawn Cemetery.

== Legacy ==
Steve Phillips' starting gate is credited for the growth of harness racing post-war.

He was named the first recipient of the United States Harness Writers Association Proximity Award in 1952.

Along with E. Roland Harriman, he was one of the first two living members elected to the Hall of Fame of the Trotter in 1962. In 1968, he was honored with the "Meritorious Award" by the Ohio chapter of the United States Harness Writers Association in Columbus.
