= Roosevelt Raceway =

Racing course in Westbury, New York

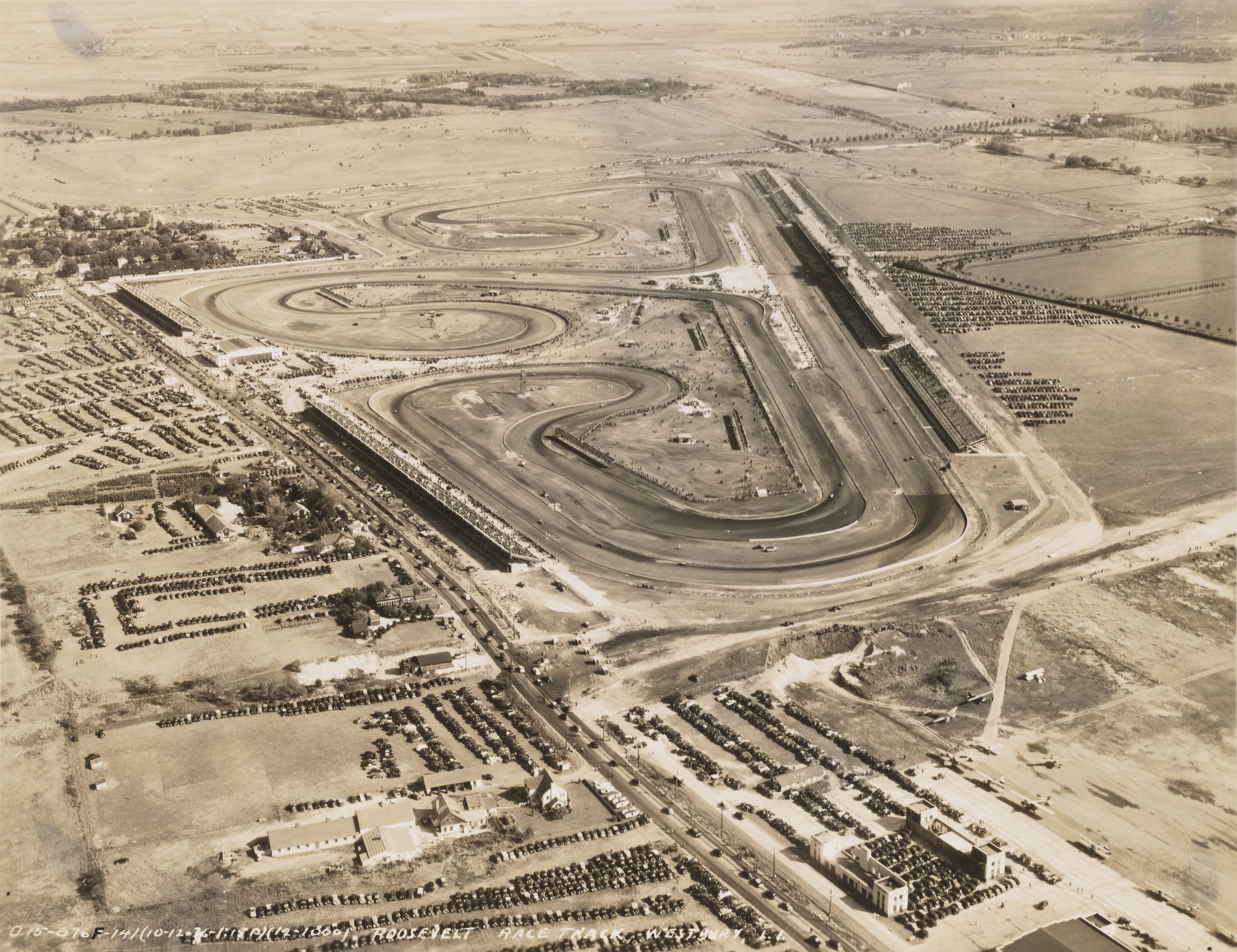
- Army Air Forces aerial photograph of Roosevelt Raceway during the 1936 Vanderbilt Cup
- Interactive map of Roosevelt Raceway
- Location: Westbury, New York, United States
- Coordinates: 40.739722°N 73.597112°W
- Date opened: circa 1936
- Date closed: July 15, 1988
- Race type: Auto racing, harness racing
- Notable races: Vanderbilt Cup, Messenger Stakes

Roosevelt Raceway was a race track located just outside the village of Westbury on Long Island, New York.

Initially created as a venue for the 1936 Vanderbilt Cup auto race, it was converted to a ½-mile harness racing facility (the actual circumference was 100 feet shorter). The harness racing facility operated from September 2, 1940, until July 15, 1988.

It was the original home of the Messenger Stakes, part of the Triple Crown of Harness Racing for Pacers. The raceway hosted the event until it closed. It was also the first track to use the now universal "mobile starting gate" by Stephen G. Phillips.

The facility was sold in 1984 on the condition it was to remain an operating racetrack, but the facilities deteriorated, attendance dropped off, and the track was no longer profitable.

The site of Roosevelt Raceway is part of the Hempstead Plains, located in an unincorporated area of the Town of Hempstead, within the Westbury 11590 Zip Code. It is located near where the first English colonial governor of New York, Richard Nicolls, established the "Newmarket Course", the first horse-racing track in North America (and the first organized sport of any kind) in the territory that would become the United States, in 1664.

== Racing ==
=== Auto racing ===
Following the end of the Great Depression, George Washington Vanderbilt III, George Preston Marshall and Eddie Rickenbacker raised money to build a home for a revived Vanderbilt Cup, which had been dormant since its last running in 1916. 1908 Vanderbilt Cup winner George Robertson was hired to oversee construction of the facility. The land was acquired by lease of the land that was "Unit 2" of the Roosevelt Field airport, and was the site of the runway from which Charles Lindbergh took off in the Spirit of St. Louis.

The track for the 1936 event was twisty and bumpy, not quite suited to the big-bore big-BHP racecars of the day, and a number of the drivers did not like the track. The layout for the 1937 event was faster, with fewer corners and longer straights. Despite these adaptations, no Indy car races were held there afterwards, although Roosevelt Raceway was the site of the 1939 National Midget auto racing championship. The track has been recreated in at least two racing games, Spirit of Speed 1937 and the Grand Prix Legends racing simulation.

=== Harness racing ===
The property was leased in 1939 by a group of investors (Old Country Trotting Association) led by George Morton Levy with the intention of opening a harness racing track. However, unlike previous incarnations of the sport, Levy's track would race at night, with single heat races, in an attempt to bring the "hick sport" to the populous Long Island area. With World War II in progress, attendance and profit were minimal in the first few years. The track opened September 2, 1940 with a crowd of 5,000 which bet a total of $40,742 and saw the first race won by the horse "Martha Lee".

== Expansion and innovation ==
One of the difficulties harness racing faced was the start of races, which usually required multiple restarts to make sure each entrant had an equal chance. On May 24, 1946, Levy introduced the mobile starting gate, which eliminated most restart-related delays. Attendance quickly boomed. On June 30, 1956 the track would host the inaugural Messenger Stakes, part of the new "Triple Crown of Harness Racing for Pacers". The race was won by Belle Acton, who tied the track record and won $32,320. In 1957 a new, much larger grandstand was opened, which included such features as dining and air conditioned areas, as well as a new toteboard. The grandstand was known as the "Dream Track". On August 20, 1960 attendance was 54,861 for a racing card that included the International Trot, which at the time was the largest crowd to witness a horse race in the U.S.

By 1956 the original Vanderbilt grandstands were burdened by excessive additions and dangerous decay. Within the next season the new clubhouse-grandstand "plant" replaced the old Vanderbilt track without interruption of the racing schedule.

The new building was designed by Arthur Froehlich who designed other innovative modern structures. The architectural plans cost $400,000 and the building was proposed at $12 million. In the end the new "Dream Track" (as it was nicknamed) cost $20 million. (The various tote boards alone cost approximately $800,000.) The new "plant" consisted of five levels with suspended security levels between floors. It boasted a 14-bed hospital with a fully functional operating room, radio and television broadcast rooms and two restaurants run by Harry M. Stevens, Inc. A new synthetic track was constructed and more than 105,000 watts of light lit its homestretch. Closed-circuit television of each race was broadcast throughout the grandstand.

== Historic moments ==
On opening night (September 2, 1940) the horse, Miss June, collapsed and died on the track after winning the fifth race. In 1942, George Levy was saddled with mounting debt. He would have to raise $20,000 or forfeit the raceway. This loan would prove almost disastrous to Roosevelt Raceway when Levy came under investigation of the Kefauver Committee in the 1950s. In 1944 the Raceway was in dire straits (again) and about to be evicted from the premises for $70,000 back rent, Mr. Levy bargained to purchase the land for the meager sum of $950,000 (satisfied on May 17, 1956).

On November 8, 1963, only two horses finished following a mid-race crash. The race was declared official, which angered many of the 23,127 fans in attendance that night, setting off a riot. First throwing bottles and other debris, the fans then began jumping over the railing, smashing the tote board, and then attacking first the judges booth and then the police who attempted to interfere. After the fans began to set fires, arriving firemen set their hoses on the rioters to push them back. 15 people were treated for injuries.

In 1964 the largest twin double was hit for 172,726.80 for a $2 ticket by Robert and Mary Froner. The property was utilized by several organizations for other events. After Roosevelt Raceway closed in 1988, the Plain and Fancy Shows, Inc used the facility as a flea market. Roosevelt Raceway was the first race track to be accepted by the American Stock Exchange (1956).

=== Festival of Hope ===
In August 1972, Nassau County's first major rock festival took place at Roosevelt Raceway when the Nassau Easter Seals Society presented the Festival of Hope. The 2-day festival featured performances by Ike & Tina Turner, Sly & The Family Stone, Jefferson Airplane, Chuck Berry, James Brown, The Shirelles, Sha-na-na, Billy Preston, Dr. Hook, Looking Glass, Bo Diddly, Stephen Stills, McKendree Spring, Elephant's Memory, The James Gang, and Commander Cody. The promoters expected to raise $300,000 for the Nassau Society for Crippled Children and Adults, but the attendance was estimated at only 20,000 to 40,000, much lower than the expected 80,000.

=== Summersault '74 ===
The most notable event was a rock concert; "Summersault '74", which drew a crowd of 75,000 (and featured performances by Crosby, Stills, Nash & Young, Joni Mitchell, Jesse Colin Young, and the Beach Boys).

== Decline, closure, and post-closure ==
The introduction of off-track betting in New York in 1971 coincided with a decline in attendance at all the state's racetracks, which was then exacerbated by the opening of the Meadowlands Racetrack in 1976, which was located much closer to Manhattan, and had regular buses to and from the Port Authority, compared to a single "track bus" that ran once or twice an evening each way. In the case of Roosevelt Raceway, commercial growth outside the raceway brought new attractions that diverted people to other interests. In the end, Roosevelt Raceway's ticket sales could barely support its daily operating costs. In addition, the land value began to skyrocket, making Roosevelt Raceway a target for developers with purposes of demolition and development attempts were opposed by citizens of Nassau County citing loss of jobs.

In 1984 the site was sold by Madison Square Garden, at the time a subsidiary of Gulf+Western, to a group of investors (Roosevelt Raceway Associates) led by incumbent raceway president Bill Hopkins and investor Charles L. Evans, via $54 million in tax-free bonds issued by the Town of Hempstead Industrial Development Agency. At the time of purchase they promised " . . to successfully operate the Roosevelt Raceway in its existing location and to preserve a traditional source of enjoyment and revenue for the citizens of Hempstead and surrounding communities." But Raceway Associates closed the track in 1988, and became embroiled in a controversy over the bonds, that would lead to an investigation that would include New York Senator Alfonse D'Amato.

No one would be found guilty of any legal wrongdoing. At the time of closure, the property was valued at approximately $200 million. Neither the investment group nor other developers were able to develop the site, and as the facilities were not maintained, the grandstand and stables began to decay and the track removed. Although shopping centers were soon built on the former parking lots and stable areas, the grandstand would not be demolished until 2002.

Little remains of Roosevelt Raceway, other than the name, which still graces a shopping center, known as Westbury Plaza, and an AMC Theatres movie theater located on the former parking lot. The site of the grandstand and track which lay vacant for years is now the site of a luxury condominium complex, Meadowbrook Pointe, which began operation in 2006. The shopping center and movie theater are located five minutes away from the Roosevelt Field Mall. The area to the east, now a Home Depot, was the location of the stables. The last plot of Raceway property was converted into the Archstone and Avalon apartment complexes. The street names within Avalon are inspired by the track, with names such as Roosevelt Way and Trotting Lane.
