= Mark Ford (harness racing) =

Personal information
- Born: October 12, 1970 (age 55) Ronceverte, West Virginia, United States
- Occupation: Harness racing trainer

Horse racing career
- Sport: Horse racing

Major racing wins
- North America Cup (2000); Meadowlands Pace (2000); Breeders Crown 3YO Colt & Gelding Pace (2000); Tattersalls Pace (2000); Art Rooney Pace (2000); Adios Pace (2008)

Racing awards
- Dan Patch Trainer of the Year Award (2000)

Significant horses
- Gallo Blue Chip, Whosurboy, Turnpike Token, Armbro Animate, Self Professed, Shadow Play On The Attack
- Updated on November 3, 2016

Mark Ford (born October 12, 1970, in Ronceverte, West Virginia) is a trainer of Standardbred horses in the sport of harness racing. He is best known as the trainer of Gallo Blue Chip, 2000 Harness Horse of the Year and the then richest pacer of all time. That year, Mark Ford was voted the Dan Patch Trainer of the Year Award along with co-winner Jimmy Takter. Mark Ford also trained Shadow Play in his major United States races for his Canadian trainer and co-owner Dr. Ian Moore. Ford won the 2008 Adios Pace at Pocono Downs.

In 2016, Mark Ford was elected President of the Standardbred Owners Association of New Jersey (SBOANJ).
