= Summerside Raceway =

Horse racing course in Prince Edward Island, Nova Scotia

Coordinates: 46.399194°N 63.798578°W

- Interactive map of Summerside Raceway
- Location: Summerside, Prince Edward Island, Canada
- Date opened: 1888
- Course type: Harness racing (half-mile dirt oval)
- Notable races: Governor's Plate

Summerside Raceway is a Canadian harness racing track located in Summerside, Prince Edward Island, Canada.

== History ==
The original Summerside Trotting Park opened in 1876 in Travellers Rest, east of town, before moving within Summerside. The half-mile track and its property were owned by Prince Edward Island native Stephen MacNeill. The track's first trot took place on October 24, 1876.

In 1888, Summerside Driving Park opened at a new site on the northwest corner of Notre Dame and Northumberland streets in Summerside, Prince Edward Island, under the ownership of William T. Green. Among the early races of prominent stallions were Hernando, an American-bred horse, and Black Pilot, a Prince Edward Island-bred horse. Around 5,000 people attended the Hernando–Black Pilot race on August 30, 1888, coming from all parts of the region.

=== Summerside Raceway ===
Summerside Raceway Ltd. was formed to conduct local harness racing in the early 1950s. The half-mile track was officially opened as the Summerside Raceway on July 1, 1953. More than 8,000 people attended opening day at the Summerside racing plant, marking the largest crowd in Prince County, Prince Edward Island. Rt. Hon. Louis St. Laurent, then prime minister of Canada, addressed the crowd. The facility included a grandstand, stables, updated lighting and sound, and a resurfaced track, with costs near $175,000.

The Governor's Plate was established as the main feature of the Summerside racing calendar for standardbred horses. Summerside Raceway hosts the Governor's Plate each July, a top racing event in Atlantic Canada. The inaugural event made its debut on July 18, 1969.

The first winter racing card was introduced at the Summerside track in December 1970 by Bob Dewar, after which it became the province's primary winter harness racing venue. In the late 1970s, the Prince County Horsemen's Association took over Summerside Raceway's operating lease. The raceway's 100th anniversary was held in 1986.

In 1997, Bert McWade, then vice-president of sales and promotions for the Atlantic Lottery Corporation, developed a three-year, $13 million plan to place eight tracks, including the Summerside raceway, under the corporation's day-to-day operation. The region's harness racing tracks came under the control of the Atlantic Lottery Corporation in May 1998. During the 1998 season, the Summerside track held many promotional events in conjunction with the lottery corporation.

=== Red Shores ===
The racing facility taken over by the Atlantic Lottery was rebranded as Red Shores at the Summerside Raceway in 2009. Red Shores' Summerside Raceway is currently one of the two principal tracks in P.E.I., the other being Charlottetown Driving Park. It is situated at 55 Greenwood Drive, adjoining Credit Union Place.

== Track records ==
Time	Horse	Date	Driver	Notes
2:12¾	Billy Cope	July 1, 1932	H. N. Power	Previous record 2:15¼
2:07.5	Happy L.	July 17, 1943	Earle Semple	
2:09.4	Headway	September 27, 1953	Jimmie Given	Pacing record
2:06.0	Bay State Pat	July 23, 1955	J. MacGregor	Pacing record
2:00.0	Gemini Risk	July 2, 1984	Wally Hennessey	
1:59.0	Winner's Accolade	July 25, 1986	Jody Hennessey	
2:05.2	Scarlet Nite	July 21, 1988	D. McLean	Trotting record for three-year-olds
1:55.3	Woodmere Topcat	October 9, 1998	Todd Trites	
1:51.4	Ys Lotus	July 16, 2016	Marc Campbell	Pacing record
1:57.2	Osprey Impact	July 14, 2017	Walter Cheverie	Trotting record
1:51.1	Roll Em	July 9, 2023	Marc Campbell	Pacing record
1:57.1	Bless Me Father	August 24, 2025	Marc Campbell	Trotting record

== See also ==
- List of horse racing venues
- Summerside, Prince Edward Island
