= George Morton Levy =

American lawyer and harness racing promoter (1888-1977)

- Born: George Morton Levy; June 26, 1888; Seaford, New York, U.S.
- Died: July 19, 1977 (aged 88); Mineola, New York, U.S.
- Education: New York University School of Law
- Occupation: Lawyer
- Known for: Roosevelt Raceway
- Honors: United States Harness Racing Hall of Fame (1967)

George Morton Levy (June 26, 1888 – July 19, 1977) was an American lawyer and harness racing executive who founded the Roosevelt Raceway. He was inducted into the United States Harness Racing Hall of Fame in 1967.

== Early life and education ==
George Morton Levy was born in 1888 in Seaford, New York, United States. He was the son of Adolph Levy and Anna Katz.

When he was one year old, his family moved to Freeport, New York in 1889. At Freeport High School, he excelled as a shortstop in baseball. He also joined the Freeport High School football team and, despite his size, became the team's star quarterback and captain. He went on to graduate cum laude from New York University. After earning his law degree from New York University School of Law at the age of 20, he returned to Freeport.

== Career ==
=== Criminal attorney ===
In 1911, George Morton Levy was admitted to the bar and began practicing law. Levy, who partnered with S. Dimon Smith and spent a period associated with George Wallace in Jamaica, Queens, organized a law firm in 1911 with Elvin N. Edwards of Brooklyn. His first legal office opened in Freeport in 1912. Impatient from the lack of clients, he entered real estate, then tried his hand at criminal law in the Nassau County courthouses.

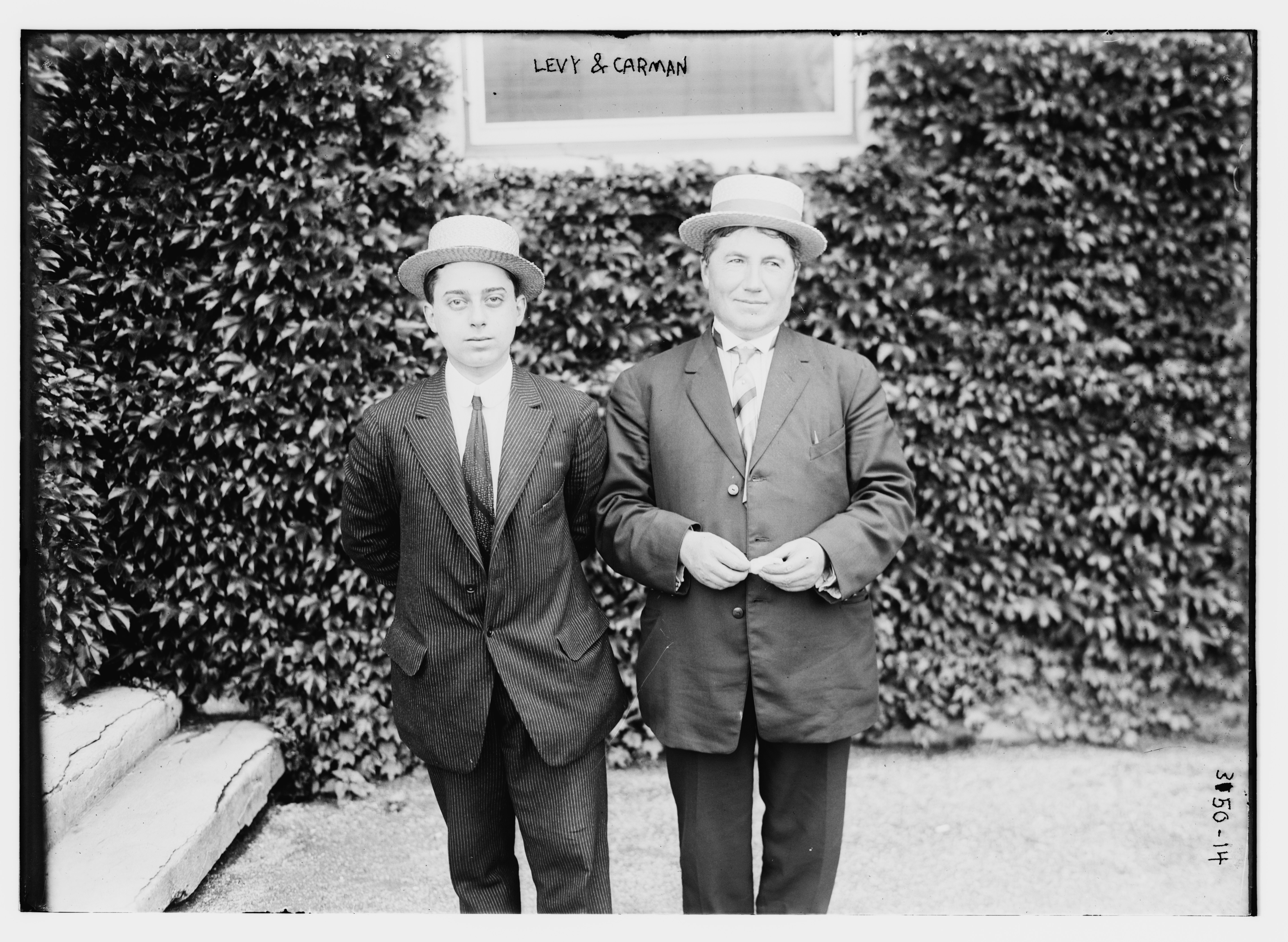
George Morton Levy & Dr. E.C. Carman, 1914

He served as defense counsel in Florence Carman's second trial for the 1914 murder of a patient of her husband, Dr. Edwin C. Carman, resulting in her acquittal on May 8, 1915.

He entered a partnership with Supreme Court Justice Townsend Scudder in 1921 under the firm name of Townsend Scudder and George Morton Levy with offices in Freeport and Manhattan. He spent five years at the firm.

He formed a law practice with Freeport attorneys Leo Fishel and Peter Stephen Beck in 1925, continuing as Levy & Fishel until 1933 and later with Elvin N. Edwards in late 1934.

During the early 1930s, Levy worked with Samuel Seabury on a probe into the Tammany Hall administration, ultimately targeting Mayor Jimmy Walker.

Serving as Lucky Luciano's lead trial lawyer in 1936, Levy, together with Francis W. H. Adams, challenged the high-profile forced prostitution case brought by Thomas E. Dewey, the future Governor of New York. He also represented crime boss Arnold Rothstein with George Z. Medalie.

Levy entered into a law partnership with former District Attorney Martin W. Littleton known as Littleton & Levy by 1937. Under Littleton & Levy in 1938, he served as counsel for Midget Speedways, Inc., which leased a racetrack once part of the Roosevelt Field.

=== Roosevelt Raceway ===
He soon took on a venture outside the field of law following passage of an enabling act for parimutuel betting he supported in Albany, New York. Together with a group of investors (Old Country Trotting Association), he leased the abandoned Roosevelt Field track in 1939 and hired Al Saunders, then secretary of the Hambletonian Stakes. In September 1940, he opened Roosevelt Raceway in Westbury, New York. Levy created the initial concept and gradually built upon it. The track hosted harness races at night, and in 1946, Levy approved and financed the introduction of the mobile starting gate by Stephen G. Phillips. He came to be regarded as the father of modern harness racing. He was a founding trustee of the Harness Racing Museum & Hall of Fame, formed in July 1949.

He led the raceway through an era highlighted by success and scandals involving politicians and racketeers. By the mid-1940s, the New York State Racing Commission threatened that if the track were not cleared of bookmakers, its license would be withdrawn. From 1946 to 1949, Levy asked for the assistance of Frank Costello, paying $15,000 annually for four years, to have Costello keep rival bookies away from his Long Island trotting track. On March 12, 1951, Levy was summoned before the United States Senate Special Committee to Investigate Crime in Interstate Commerce. The inquiry, televised across the country, was led by the late Senator Estes Kefauver. He admitted ties to Frank Costello through legal work and golf outings at the Pomonok Country Club with Frank Erickson and Joseph Schoenbaum but denied discussing business or knowing Costello's occupation beyond gambling connections. Even with a formal exoneration and apologies from all committee members recorded in the Congressional Record, Levy's reputation suffered for years after his testimony.

He served as the executive secretary and counsel for the Old Country Trotting Association, which operated Roosevelt Raceway, reportedly making $200,000 a year in lawyer fees. Collecting 10% of the profit before tax, he was paid more than $2,000,000 in fees from Roosevelt over a 10-year span. The track attorney was involved in a 1954 state investigation which disclosed scandals in his multimillion dollar harness racing business, leading to reforms. The Roosevelt Raceway boss testified at the Moreland Act Commission's public hearings in March 1954, disclosing connections with J. Russell Sprague, George R. Fearon, John J. Dunnigan, and Norman Penny.

Levy transferred his remaining stake in Roosevelt Raceway to the San Juan Racing Association for $3.5 million in 1966. He served in a position as the track's president until his death.

== Personal life ==
Between 1919 and 1949, Levy married four times: first to Frances Hendrickson, then to Beatrice Baldwin (mother of his son), third to Margaret Kinsella (later wife of Richard Arlen), and finally to Elise Huelle, daughter of Rockville Centre attorney Herman C. Huelle.

He was a member of the Freeport Elks Lodge in the 1940s.

== Death ==
Following a heart attack, George Morton Levy died at age 89 at the Nassau Hospital in Mineola, New York, on July 19, 1977. His funeral was attended by 800 people.

== Legacy ==
Levy, remembered for his philanthropy, donated to Long Island hospitals and colleges and significantly backed the United Cerebral Palsy Association center in Roosevelt, New York.

He was honored by the United States Harness Writers Association (USHWA) in May 1949, winning the association's first-ever "Headliner Award" for his contribution to the development of harness racing. The award was presented by sportswriter Grantland Rice. He received the USHWA Proximity Award in 1962. On July 5, 1967, he was inducted into the United States Harness Racing Hall of Fame. The honor was voted on by the United States Harness Writers Association.

At the time of his death, Alan N. Cohen, then president of Madison Square Garden, remarked, "Mr. Levy was an extraordinary person. He was special people. The world, at least my world, was better because of George Morton Levy. He was a meaningful director of the corporation. He was irreplaceable at Roosevelt Raceway."

The George Morton Levy Memorial Pacing Series, a major race launched in 1978, was named in his honor.
