= Sackville Downs =

Former horse racing course in Lower Sackville, Nova Scotia

Coordinates: 44°46′21″N 63°41′39″W

Sackville Downs Raceway
- Interactive map of Sackville Downs Raceway
- Location: Lower Sackville, Nova Scotia, Canada
- Owned by: John Cruickshank
- Date opened: 1955
- Date closed: 1986
- Course type: Harness racing
- Notable races: B. C. Cruikshank Memorial Pace

Sackville Downs was a Canadian harness racing track located in Lower Sackville, Nova Scotia. It was one of Atlantic Canada's leading racetracks.

== History ==
Dairy farmer John F. "Jack" Cruickshank, alongside B. C. Cruikshank, opened the Sackville Downs Raceway for Maritime harness racing in Lower Sackville, Nova Scotia. It was funeral director B. C. Cruikshank who put forward the $500,000 motion that brought the operation to life. Jack Cruikshank served as both racing secretary and treasurer at the Halifax raceway.

The Sackville Downs Raceway was a half-mile oval track. It was located on eighteen hectares of prime real estate in Atlantic Canada. The track was named after its location in Lower Sackville and the famed Kentucky Derby track, Churchill Downs. On August 25, 1955, the Sackville Downs Raceway officially opened.

The B. C. Cruikshank Memorial Pace was established at Sackville Downs in 1959 to honor the track's founding partner, who died in 1958. Early on, it was run in two heats with a full eight-horse card and a total purse of $3,000.

By 1967, both a new clubhouse and a restaurant complex, the Sulky Room, had opened to the public. A record 91 races offering more than $250,000 in projected purses were announced by the Downs' general manager in 1969. The season stretched from May 3 to November 11, with Friday nights added during the summer months to the Monday, Wednesday, and Saturday schedule. In preparation for the season, Cruickshank hired a clubhouse operator to welcome patrons and installed a new lighting arrangement from General Electric in April, enhancing track illumination by 300%. The Quartz system was standard at most major North American harness tracks.

In November 1980, Jack Cruikshank, then president and general manager of Sackville Downs, stated the track had contributed 3.7 million in pari-mutuel taxes alone to the Nova Scotia treasury since opening on a dairy cattle farm. Challenges such as taxes, inflation, rising gas prices, and lottery competition began impacting the 25-year-old business.

The venue was also used as a dirt track for stock car racing.

By the early 1980s, the grandstand was enlarged with dining space and accommodated over 1,200 people. The paddock area contained 23 barns with roughly 300 horses year-round for trainers and drivers. The track's parimutuel betting reached a record high of over $147,000 in 1981. In 1982, three-year-old Peoples Blue Chip set a new Maritime harness racing record at the track, pacing a mile in 1:59.

After thirty years running the Lower Sackville track, Jack Cruikshank retired in 1985 and sold it to Sussex Leaseholds.

== Closure ==
It was reported by the Bank of Nova Scotia as being for sale for $5.5 million in April 1986. In July 1986, Sussex Leaseholds Ltd., owners of the track, suspended operations after failing to renew their liability insurance. Even after securing a new policy, they refused to reopen unless the government waived $300,000 in unpaid parimutuel taxes. The government agreed on the condition that harness racing continue, but the region's largest and most popular track, known for its high purses, closed permanently. In August, Sussex Leaseholds announced Sackville Downs would not reopen under their ownership. The site was acquired by Atlantic Shopping Centres Ltd., part of the Sobeys food empire.

Sackville Downs' former grounds were transformed into Downsview Mall, a plaza centered around a major grocery store in the heart of Sackville Drive's business district.

Truro Raceway honored the legacy of Sackville Downs at its harness racing meet in September 2024.

== See also ==
- List of horse racing venues
- Tartan Downs
