= United States Harness Writers Association =

American sports journalism organization

- Abbreviation: USHWA
- Founded: 1947
- Field: Sportswriting
- President: Heather Vitale
- First vice-president: Derick Giwner

The United States Harness Writers Association (USHWA) is a professional association for journalists covering harness racing in the United States. The organization was formed in 1947 and has an annual dinner-awards banquet where it names various award recipients.

== History ==
The USHWA was founded on 8 May 1947. Twelve beat reporters covering Roosevelt Raceway organized the United States Harness Writers Association after the races that day in Westbury, New York. Mike Lee, sports editor of the Long Island Press, was the founding president of the organization who would serve in his role for 13 years. The newly organized U.S. Harness Writers Association began to gather at a semi-monthly session in the raceway's clubhouse.

In October 1947, the Nassau Trotting Association established the first U.S. Harness Writers' Cup, a classified pace of one mile. It became an annual fixture on the track's program. The inaugural race was won by His Lady, driven by Joe Hylan.

By 1949, the Harness Writers' group included scribes from all sections of the country. As regional groups of harness racing writers emerged, the United States Harness Writers Association instituted chapters in 1953. In 1980, the chapters included Ohio, Monticello-Goshen, Metropolitan New York-New Jersey, Vernon, Blue Grass, New England, Western New York, Illinois, Saratoga, Florida, and Northern California. There are 12 active chapters, along with an "At-Large" category for individuals not affiliated with a specific chapter as of 2022.

== Awards ==
The association introduced nationwide balloting to select harness racing's champion horses and recognize individuals for distinguished achievements during each racing season. Track officials, owners, drivers, breeders, and all associated with harness racing were eligible. Ballots were cast by sports editors, radio experts, and turf writers throughout North America. The first banquet was organized in May 1949. The first of two annual Association Awards went to George Morton Levy and Milton Berle.

- Proximity Achievement Award: established in 1951; presented as the organization's highest honor.
- Dan Patch Award
- American Harness Horse of the Year
- Lou Levitt Memorial Award: established in 1949; presented for humanitarian work in medical research, charity, etc.
- National Heat Championship Award
- National Breeders Award
- Paul Doumeng Trophy: established in 1956; presented to the leading percentage driver in the United States.
- Clem McCarthy Good Guy Award: established in 1963; presented to the person in the sport who is deemed the most cooperative with newspapermen across the nation.

In the 1950s, it was decided that the sport should formally honor its most influential figures, leading to the creation of a Hall of Fame. The association was assigned to honor the first living members of the Harness Racing Museum & Hall of Fame in 1961. The first inductees were E. Roland Harriman and Stephen G. Phillips.

== Past presidents ==
- Mike Lee (1947–1959)
- Robert Zellner (1960–1961)
- Leonard Cohen (1962–1963)
- John J. Hugerich (1964–1965)
- Robert A. Hackett (1966–1967)
- Edward C. Binneweg (1968–1969)
- Phillip T. Hartman (1970–1971)
- William C. Connolly (1972–1973)
- Allen J. Finkelson (1974–1975)
- Ralph I. Grasso (1976–1977)
- William F. Brown Jr. (1978–1979)
- Nicholas J. Saponara (1980–1982)
- Philip A. Pines (1983–1984)
- Maury May (1985–1986)
- John Berry (1987–1988)
- Clyde Hirt (1989–1989)
- John Manzi (1990–1991)
- Marvin Bachrad (1992–1993)
- Leon J. Zimmerman (1994–1995)
- Edward A. Palladino (1996–1997)
- Joseph E. Hartmann (1998–1999)
- Bill Heller (2000–2001)
- Moira Fanning (2002–2003)
- Gordon Waterstone (2004–2005)
- Judy Davis-Wilson (2006–2007)
- Debbie Little (2008–2009)
- Jason Settlemoir (2010–2011)
- Steve Wolf (2012–2013)
- Chris Tully (2014–2015)
- Tim Bojarski (2016–2017)
- Shawn Wiles (2018–2019)
- Kimberly Rinker (2020–2021)
- Barry Lefkowitz (2022–2023)
- Michael Carter (2024–2025)
- Heather Vitale (2026–current)
