= Newmarket Course =

Former horse racing course in Hempstead, New York

Coordinates: 40°43′45″N 73°40′25″W

- Interactive map of Newmarket Course
- Location: Garden City, Nassau County, Long Island, New York, U.S.
- Date opened: 1665
- Course type: Horse racing

Newmarket Course was a horse racing track in what is now the Incorporated Village of Garden City, in Nassau County, on Long Island, in New York, United States. Opened in 1665, it was the first race track to be built in the Province of New York, and it closed in the nineteenth century.

== History ==
The Newmarket Course was established in the area of present-day Garden City, New York, within the Town of Hempstead. It was the earliest race track built in the Province of New York (now New York State) while under English control in the American colonies. Only a few miles separated the former track from present-day Belmont Park in Elmont.

When the English ousted the Dutch during the conquest of New Netherland in 1664, the main settlement, New Amsterdam, was renamed the New York Colony. Colonel Richard Nicholls, the first Colonial Governor of New York, established the province's first race course on today's Hempstead Plains on May 1, 1665. The broad plain near the town, level and covered with soft grass, was called "Salisbury Plain" after its English namesake. Nicholls, in February 1665, called a public meeting and ordered the measuring of a two-mile course on the level prairie. Noting the plains' natural suitability for horse racing, he launched an annual horse race with a silver crown or a bushel of wheat for the winner. He intended to promote horse breeding in the New York province. Nicolls criticized the Flemish horse breed, judging it better for "slow labor than fleetness or display."

In honor of King Charles II's favorite English track, Richard Nicholls named the course after Newmarket Racecourse in Newmarket, Suffolk. The Newmarket name was used again for a race course built in South Carolina in 1760, and later for another in Virginia.

The first race at the newly established Newmarket Course took place in 1665 under the governor's supervision. The site hosted races for at least 100 years following that race. On the two-mile grass course, horses raced in pairs, and the day’s last event determined the fastest. For over a century, the governor with his suite and council, New York's high officials, city gentry, and Long Island farmers met at the grounds—first yearly, then at spring and fall meetings.

Governor Francis Lovelace, New York's second English governor, carried on Nicolls's horse racing initiatives. In 1669, the colonial governor directed Hempstead justices to collect subscriptions from those interested in competing. Col. Lovelace instructed that a race be held every May and that subscriptions be sent to Captain Silvester Salisbury. As the Governor of New York from 1668 to 1673, he increased both annual prizes and race numbers and helped establish the Beaver Pond course.

In 1670, from England, Daniel Denton wrote: "Toward the middle of the island (Long Island), lies a plain 16 miles long and four miles broad, where you will find neither stick nor stone to hinder the horses' heels or endanger them in their races, and twice a year the best horses in the land are brought hither to test their swiftness."

An association organized in 1804 to remodel the old Newmarket Course, but by 1809, lacking funds and unable to control an unfenced track, they replaced it with a fenced course a mile north, keeping the original name.

The Newmarket Course was Long Island's principal race track until the spring of 1821, when an act of the New York Legislature permitted horse speed trials in Queens County during the months of May and October.

== Closure ==
In April 1827, Daniel Bedell, Butler Coles, and Thomas Jones applied to the town for a ten-year lease of sixty acres on the common plains near the former Newmarket Course, at a price to be mutually agreed on. The site of the former race track is located near the New Hyde Park LIRR station on land that is now occupied by New Hyde Park Road, Clinch Avenue and Newmarket Road.

In Garden City, New York, a plaque commemorates the Newmarket Course's site. Located at the intersection of Stewart and Hilton avenues, the plaque was dedicated on May 14, 1966 by the New York Racing Association (NYRA) to commemorate the 300th anniversary of the start of horse racing in the United States. In 1999, NYRA presented the village of Garden City with a furlong marker from Belmont Park, which was mounted near the plaque on the village green.

== See also ==
- Belmont Park
- Aqueduct Racetrack
