= Maywood Park =

Defunct American horse racing track

- Interactive map of Maywood Park
- Location: Melrose Park, Illinois
- Coordinates: 41.90635°N 87.83741°W
- Date opened: 1946
- Date closed: 2015
- Race type: Standardbred
- Notable races: Windy City Pace; Abe Lincoln; Maywood Filly Pace; Galt

Maywood Park was a horse racing venue located in Melrose Park, Illinois, United States, about 12 miles from downtown Chicago. It was used for harness racing. It had a capacity of 33,297 people and was built in 1946. The track was a half-mile oval. The track closed in 2015. The track, which had been in unincorporated Cook County, was located in Melrose Park. Demolition began in early 2019; the track was replaced by an Amazon distribution center in 2020.

== History ==
The land that would house Maywood Park was purchased by Arthur T. Galt for $64,000 in 1922 (adjusted for inflation this was more than $968,000 in 2019). Per a 1953 United States Tax Court ruling: "In 1931 the property was leased to the Cook County Fair Association, which constructed a spectators' grandstand and a one-half mile dirt oval track for harness races. Its attempt to operate a county fair was unsuccessful, however, and in 1934 petitioner ejected it from possession, but the track and the grandstand remained permanent improvements on the property."

In 1946, after parimutuel racing was granted in Illinois, Maywood Park opened as a dedicated harness-racing track. Galt and his family trust owned the land; the Maywood Trotting Association was established to run the races (the Galt family would later acquire controlling interest in the trotting association, holding 600,000 shares as of December 31, 1966).

In June 1947, the first full harness race program to be televised anywhere in the country took place at Maywood Park, and the opening night of the 1957 spring meet was televised by NBC on The Tonight Show. The original grandstand was torn down in the mid-1960s and replaced with a larger, enclosed structure. The track received a number of additional race dates after Washington Park burned down. Two associations that raced at Washington Park (Egyptian Trotting and Associates Racing) moved their dates to Maywood Park following the destructive 1973 fire.

In 1979, boxing champion Muhammad Ali won a seven-furlong exhibition race, a fundraising event to benefit Provident Hospital of Chicago.

In 1984, Maywood Park became the first Chicago-area track to host a Breeders Crown race. The Two-Year-Old Filly Pace Final carried a $550,000 prize, the largest purse ever offered at a Chicago area standardbred track.

Maywood Park has been the scene of numerous world records, including She's A Great Lady's 1:51.2 mile in 1995, a record that still stands for a three-year-old filly pacer on a half-mile track.

The Maywood Park Trotting Association was subject to a federal judgment tied to the scandal that brought down former Illinois Governor Rod Blagojevich, which forced the association into bankruptcy. The Galt Family Trust subsequently sold the land, and demolition began in 2019.

== Physical attributes ==
The track had a half-mile dirt oval, and was capable of seating at least 33,297. There was stabling on the backstretch for 984 horses.

== Racing ==
The following stakes were held at Maywood Park:

- Windy City Pace
- Maywood Filly Pace
- Abe Lincoln
- Galt
- Cinderella
- The Violet
- Honey Bears
- ISOBA Stake
