= Atlantic Lottery Corporation =

Atlantic Canada lottery organization

Coordinates: 46°05′15″N 64°46′51″W

- Type: Crown corporation
- Founded: 1976
- Headquarters: 922 Main Street; Moncton, New Brunswick; E1C 8W6
- Products: Lotteries and Video Lottery Terminals
- Revenue: CA $ 872.7 million (2023–2024)
- Number of employees: 600+
- Website: www.alc.ca

The Atlantic Lottery Corporation (ALC) (French: Société des loteries de l'Atlantique), branded as simply Atlantic Lottery or Loto Atlantique, is a Canadian organization that provides government-regulated lottery products in Atlantic Canada. They offer a wide range of games, from draw games to online bingo; breakopen tickets to sports wagering; and games in both social settings and online.

Atlantic Lottery is owned jointly by the four Atlantic provincial governments: New Brunswick, Prince Edward Island, Nova Scotia and Newfoundland and Labrador, who jointly share in its profits.

Atlantic Lottery's head office is located in Moncton, New Brunswick, with regional offices in Halifax, Nova Scotia and St. John's, Newfoundland and Labrador. Prince Edward Island is home to Atlantic Lottery's Red Shores Racetrack and Casino in Charlottetown, and Red Shores at Summerside Raceway.

== History ==
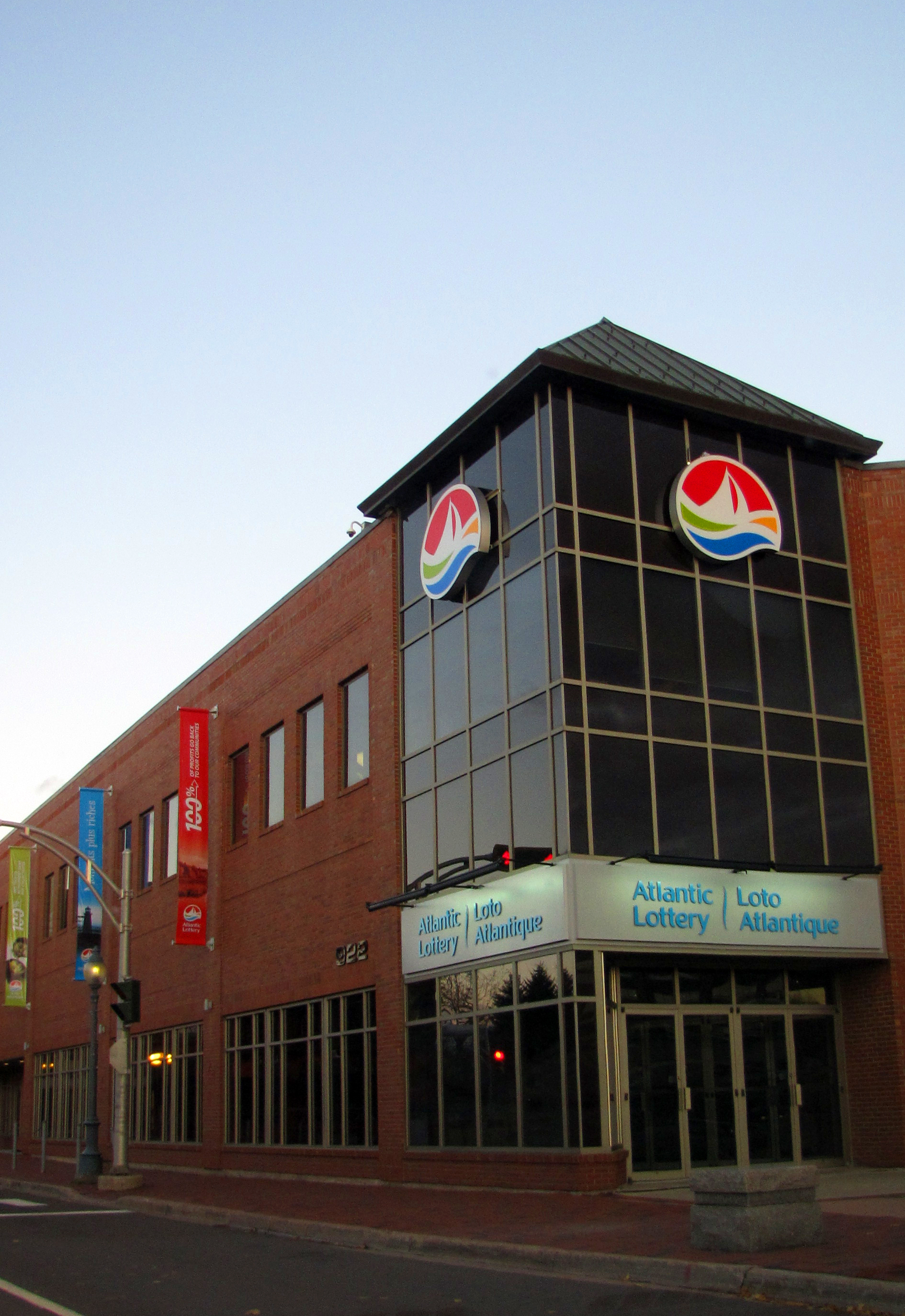
The headquarters of ALC in downtown Moncton

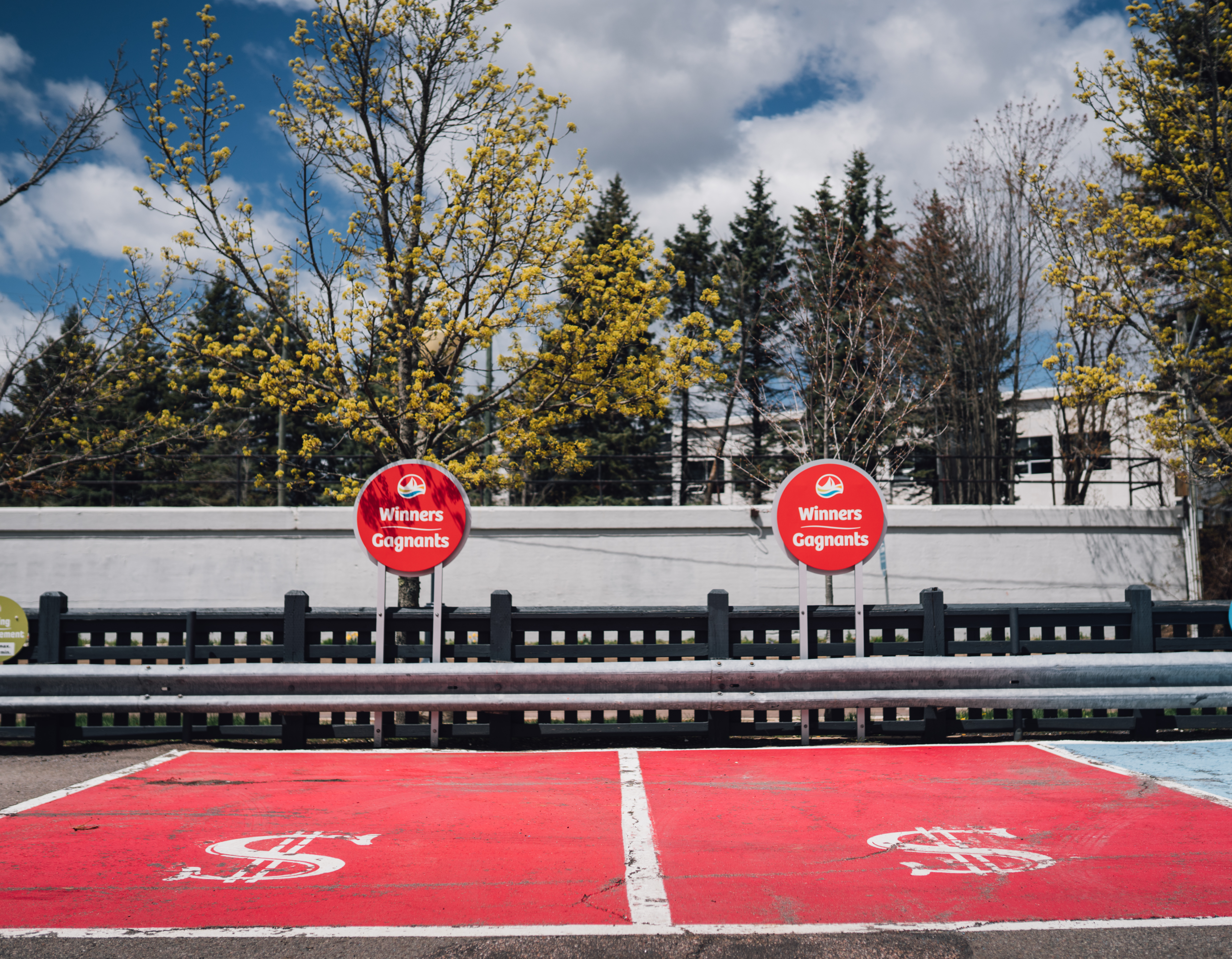
The winners parking spots at the ALC headquarters in Moncton

ALC was founded in 1976, shortly after the founding of government lotteries elsewhere in Canada. The first and only game offered at this time was A-1, a $1 game sold in books of five, with draws occurring biweekly. While Atlantic Lottery’s first games were only available on a regional basis, it quickly joined the Interprovincial Lottery Corporation, which offered national draws.

In 1977, ALC began sponsoring the Canada Games.

In 1987, Atlantic Lottery was the first lottery organization in the world to print a bar code on all draw and scratch tickets, allowing for instant verification of a prize. In 1990, they introduced the first regulated video lottery terminals in Canada.

Atlantic Lottery made history once again in 2004 with the introduction of PlaySphere, making them the first lottery jurisdiction in North America to offer lottery products online. PlaySphere has since been rebranded as alc.ca.

From 2004-06, Atlantic Lottery was named one of Canada's Top 100 Employers, as published in Maclean's magazine.

The Charlottetown Driving Park Entertainment Centre (now the Red Shores Racetrack and Casino) first opened their doors in 2005, offering harness racing, a gaming floor and a restaurant.

In 2012, Atlantic Lottery launched an Employee Social Responsibility certification program, becoming the first lottery in the world to launch an internal SR certification program. By 2014, the World Lottery Association recognized Atlantic Lottery for the “Best Innovation in Responsible Gaming” for its Ask Away information site.

Atlantic Lottery became a member of the Canadian Centre for Diversity and Inclusion (CCDI) in 2016.

Since its inception in 1976, Atlantic Lottery returned over $11.3 billion in profits to the four Atlantic Provinces. In 2021-22, $438.1 million in profit was returned to its four governmental shareholders.

== Controversies ==
In 2008, Dr Peter McKenna, a professor of political science at University of PEI wrote "Terminal Damage: the politics of VLTs in Atlantic Canada" which was sharply critical of politicians' support for gambling in the region.

In 2017, a class action lawsuit was initiated in Newfoundland and Labrador against the ALC claiming the Video Lottery Terminals it operates in the province deceive players into thinking they can win over the long term. The case went as far as the Supreme Court of Canada which in 2020 ruled it could not proceed further.

ALC's decision to implement an online casino for Nova Scotia in 2021 following a similar initiative in New Brunswick in 2020 was criticized by a Halifax counsellor specializing in gambling addiction, who told the CBC that, "the perceived legitimacy of the website being endorsed by the government" could lead to more use, noting that there was a moratorium and planned phaseout of physical VLTs in the province at the same time the virtual ones were being launched.

In 2022, journalists from King's College's journalism program produced a investigative series about the continuing harm from VLTs in Nova Scotia, where the Nova Scotia Gaming Corporation acknowledges one in ten VLT users are problem gamblers.

== Games and products ==
- Draw Games:
  - Lotto 6/49 (national) — draws on Wednesdays and Saturdays
  - Lotto Max (national) — draws on Tuesdays and Fridays
    - Twist (regional) — a regional add-on for Lotto Max in Atlantic Canada.
  - Atlantic 49 (regional) – draws on Wednesdays and Saturdays
  - Hit or Miss (regional) – a daily draw game that includes an instant win component
  - Tag (regional) – an add-on game purchased with other draw tickets
  - Keno Atlantic (regional) -a daily keno game where players can choose their wager
  - Bucko (regional) – a daily 5/41 draw game that costs only $1 to play
  - Salsa Bingo (regional) - a daily bingo draw game
  - Poker Lotto (regional) – a daily draw game
  - Lotto 4 (regional) – a daily draw game where players can choose their wager
- Sports betting:
  - Pro-Line
- Other conventional games:
  - Scratch-n-Win (national and regional scratch tickets, including popular games such as Set For Life, Crossword and Bingo)
  - Breakopen (Pull-tabs)
  - Video lottery terminals
- Internet-based games:
  - alc.ca - a large variety of Atlantic Lottery’s games are available to purchase and play online
  - GeoLotto - Formerly known as GeoSweep, a cancelled map-based lottery game

=== Red Shores ===
Red Shores is the only casino on Prince Edward Island, with the Racetrack and Casino at Charlottetown Driving Park offering over 150 slots, Blackjack, UTH, Baccarat, Roulette and a private Poker Room. Red Shores' Summerside location offers a gaming floor with 30 VLT machines.

Red Shores Charlottetown and Summerside showcase harness racing, which is live streamed with broadcasts begin approximately 15 minutes prior to first race Post Time.

== Major sponsorships ==
Atlantic Lottery sponsors more than 100 community festivals and events across the region every year.

Atlantic Lottery Corporation has supported the Canada Games for over four decades – beginning in 1977 when ALC provided sports bags to every Atlantic Canadian athlete - although no information is yet available about whether this will continue in 2025 when the games come to St John's.
