= Dan Patch Award =

American horse racing award

- Awarded for: American Harness Racing
- Country: United States
- Presented by: United States Harness Writers Association (USHWA)
- First award: 1985
- Website: USHWA website

The Dan Patch Award is an annual award created in 1985 by members of the United States Harness Writers Association (USHWA). The association's website states that their members' determination is aided by input from the American Harness Racing Secretaries plus logistic expertise provided by the United States Trotting Association.

== United States Harness Horse of the Year ==
- American Harness Horse of the Year

== Pacing horses ==
- Dan Patch Pacer of the Year Award
- Dan Patch Award for 2-Year-Old Pacing Colt
- Dan Patch Award for 2-Year-Old Pacing Filly
- Dan Patch Award for 3-Year-Old Pacing Colt
- Dan Patch Award for 3-Year-Old Pacing Filly
- Dan Patch Award for Older Male Pacer
- Dan Patch Award for Older Female Pacer

== Trotting horses ==
- Dan Patch Trotter of the Year Award
- Dan Patch Award for 2-Year-Old Trotting Colt
- Dan Patch Award for 2-Year-Old Trotting Filly
- Dan Patch Award for 3-Year-Old Trotting Colt
- Dan Patch Award for 3-Year-Old Trotting Filly
- Dan Patch Award for Older Male Trotter
- Dan Patch Award for Older Female Trotter

== Individuals ==
- Dan Patch Achievement Award
- Dan Patch Owner of the Year Award
- Dan Patch Breeder of the Year Award
- Dan Patch Trainer of the Year Award (winner receives the Glen Garnsey Trophy)
- Dan Patch Driver of the Year Award
- Dan Patch Rising Star Award
- Dan Patch Breakthrough Award (winner receives the Lew Barasch Trophy)
- Dan Patch Caretaker of the Year Award
- Dan Patch Broodmare of the Year Award
- Dan Patch Humanitarian Award
- Dan Patch Fan Award
- Dan Patch Unsung Hero Award
- Dan Patch Good Guy Award (winner receives the William. R. Haughton Trophy)
