= Nova Scotia Gaming Corporation =

Gambling/gaming regulation organization

The Nova Scotia Gaming Corporation (NSGC)
- Company type: Government of Nova Scotia Agency
- Industry: Video Lottery, Ticket Lottery, Casinos
- Headquarters: 5151 George Street; Suite 800; Halifax, Nova Scotia; B3J 2Y3, Canada
- Key people: Stephen MacDonald (A/President & CEO)
- Products: Lotteries, Casinos, Slots. Bingo
- Owner: Government of Nova Scotia
- Website: www.nsgc.ca

The Nova Scotia Gaming Corporation (NSGC) is a Crown corporation governed by the provincial Gaming Control Act.

The Nova Scotia government, and ultimately the people of Nova Scotia, are the shareholders and owners of the gaming industry in the Province. The industry is licensed and regulated by the Alcohol and Gaming Division of the Department of Labour and Advanced Education. It is managed by NSGC.

The Corporation's role is to ensure the gaming industry is as socially responsible as possible, while generating reasonable profits. The provincial government makes the big picture, policy decisions about how the industry will be operated in Nova Scotia. NSGC manages and implements those decisions. NSGC also oversees and manages the gaming operators who carry out the day-to-day business of gaming - Casino Nova Scotia (CNS) and Atlantic Lottery.

== Mandate ==
The Nova Scotia Gaming Corporation (NSGC) is responsible for the business of gaming in Nova Scotia. It is a Crown corporation governed by the provincial Gaming Control Act, and is charged with leading an economically sustainable and socially responsible gaming industry for the benefit of Nova Scotians and their communities.

Operations include ticket lotteries, video lotteries and casinos. The day-to-day operations of NSGC's businesses are carried out by its operators. The Atlantic Lottery Corporation (ALC) operates the ticket and video lottery businesses and the Great Canadian Entertainment owns and operates Casino Nova Scotia (CNS) in Halifax and Sydney.

In delegating the day-to-day operations of the lines of business to these operators, NSGC works to ensure that both ALC and GCGC:

- operate in an effective and efficient manner to maximize revenues for the Province;
- comply with the Criminal Code of Canada, the Gaming Control Act and all provincial regulations;
- respond to policy and strategic direction provided by NSGC; and
- understand the importance of, and help to, implement responsible gambling and prevention programs in Nova Scotia.

=== Video Lottery ===
In Nova Scotia, the Atlantic Lottery Corporation acts as the Nova Scotia Gaming Corporation's (NSGC) agent in operating both ticket and video lottery programs in the Province.

=== Ticket Lottery ===
The Nova Scotia Gaming Corporation's (NSGC) oldest line of business in the province is ticket lotteries. Tickets have been offered in Nova Scotia since 1976. The Atlantic Lottery Corporation (ALC) operates ticket lotteries for NSGC. Tickets include national draw games like Lotto 6/49 and Lotto Max; regional draw games like Bucko, Salsa Bingo, Keno Lottery, Twist and TAG; Scratch'n Win games such as Crossword and Bingo; breakopen games like Criss Cross, as well as sports games like Pro•Line, Pro•Line Pools and Pro•Line Totals.

=== Casinos ===
Ten years after Casino Nova Scotia (CNS) began operating, a new operator and a new casino contract took over. On May 31, 2005, Great Canadian Gaming Corporation (GCGC) took ownership over both CNS properties.
