= Windy City Pace =

Harness race for pacing horses

The Windy City Pace was a harness race for 3-year-old Standardbred pacing horses. It was run annually from 1983 to 2015 at Maywood Park in Melrose Park, Illinois, a suburb of Chicago.

The race was originally run during Maywood's spring meet but, after 1991, it was run in the fall. Elimination heats were required to determine the finalists for the main race. It was the top race of a program that also featured Maywood's other top stakes races — the Abe Lincoln, the Galt and the Cinderella.

A notable running of the Windy City was in 1987, when Bomb Rickles won the final at odds of 190-1.

In 2015 the purse was $180,000. Maywood park closed that year.

== Windy City Pace winners ==
Year	Winner	Driver	Time
1983	Trim the Tree	Dick Macomber	1:57 1/5
1984	Carl's Bird	Carl E. Allen	1:56 3/5
1985	Pinocchio	Neal Shapiro	1:56 0/0
1986	Incredible Finale	Tom Harmer	1:53 3/5
1987	Bomb Rickles	Neal Shapiro	1:56 2/5
1988	Wealthy Skipper	Walter Paisley	1:55 0/0
1989	Just the Ticket	Lavern Hostetler	1:56 1/5
1990	Jake and Elwood	Hervé Filion	1:57 2/5
1991	Precious Bunny	Jack Moiseyev	1:57 0/0
1992	Western Hanover	William Fahy	1:55 0/0
1993	Presidential Ball	Jack Moiseyev	1:54 2/5
1994	Pacific Rocket	Jack Moiseyev	1:53 0/0
1995	Village Connection	Paul MacDonell	1:53 4/5
1996	Oye Vay	Douglas S. Brown	1:54 1/5
1997	Arturo	Dave Palone	1:54 2/5
1998	Take Down the Flag	Paul MacDonell	1:53 3/5
1999	Looking for Art	Eric Ledford	1:54 2/5
2000	Camotion	Dale Hiteman	1:51 4/5
2001	Rattle & Rock	Ryan Anderson	1:51 4/5
2002	Three Olives	John Campbell	1:52 4/5
2003	Allamerican Captor	Luc Ouellette	1:52 2/5
2004	Western Terror	Brian Sears	1:53 4/5
2005	Thin Blue Line	Michael Oosting	1:52 3/5
2006	Jereme's Jet	Dave Magee	1:52 2/5
2007	Booze Cruzin	Sam Widger	1:51 3/5
2008	Shadow Play	David Miller	1:50 4/5
2009	In Over My Head	Dale Hiteman	1:52 2/5
2010	Aracache Hanover	Doug McNair	1:51 4/5
2011	Betterthancheddar	George Brennan	1:52 2/5
2012	Pet Rock	Doug McNair	1:51 4/5
2013	Word Power	Scott Zeron	1:51 4/5
2014	Big Boy Dreams	Tim Tetrick	1:51 0/0
