= Truro Raceway =

Horse racing course in Bible Hill, Nova Scotia

Coordinates: 45.377°N 63.271°W

- Location: 73 Ryland Ave, Bible Hill, Colchester County, Nova Scotia, Canada
- Date opened: 1865
- Course type: Harness racing

Truro Raceway is a Canadian harness racing track in Bible Hill, Nova Scotia. It ranks among the oldest racetracks in Canada.

== History ==
The Truro Raceway, the largest of Nova Scotia's three harness racing tracks, opened in 1865.

During a difficult stretch in 1948, the Jollity Horsemen's Club, led by Eric Whebby, assumed management of Truro Raceway. By the late 1940s, it became the first track in Nova Scotia with night racing, a mobile starting gate, and parimutuel betting. The Jollity Stakes, held in August 1960, set a record as the Maritimes' richest turf classic, with a $6,000 purse.

In 1966, Truro Raceway underwent $100,000 in renovations, leading to higher attendance, better purses, and improved amenities. $70,000 built a heated, glass-enclosed grandstand, completed in November with 2,000 seats—the first in the Maritimes and east of Quebec City. The track was resurfaced with 500 tons of crusher dust, plus 400 more tons after the season. A new 100-horse stable replaced the old 200-horse facility.

On Labor Day in 1981, 200 firemen and 23 pieces of equipment from 10 fire brigades were called to Truro Raceway. The C.A. Douglas Grandstand was destroyed by arson, but none of the horses, including several top Maritimes horses entered in the Donnie Turner Memorial, were injured.

The track's signature Atlantic Grand Circuit Week began in 1982 under past manager Brent MacGrath.

During the July 1990 Atlantic Grand Circuit Week, Truro Raceway showcased $250,000 in upgrades: a resurfaced track and an advanced ship-in and retention barn. As Atlantic Canada's oldest track, it was redesigned to fit eight starters. Chuck and Greg Coon led renovations that widened and banked the track and replaced the unsafe hub rail with Europe's rubber pylon-based Euro-rail system. The Atlantic Post Calls named the Truro Raceway management committee as the 1990 Award of Merit recipient, citing its "million-dollar-plus investment into track facilities at Truro."

In January 1994, Truro Raceway Inc. presented its simulcasting plan, debuting the province's first simulcast in mid-March.

The half-mile track now offers live harness racing between May and November. The raceway stables over 100 horses, with additional horses arriving on race nights to use visiting stalls. The facility includes a grandstand, restaurant, and betting services. The grandstand at the Truro Raceway houses a simulcasting lounge and the Rustic Table Restaurant.

== See also ==
- List of horse racing venues
