= Charlottetown Driving Park =

Race track in Charlottetown, Prince Edward Island

Coordinates: 46°14′46″N 63°6′54″W

The Charlottetown Driving Park (CDP), located in Charlottetown, Prince Edward Island, Canada, is a harness racing track for racing standardbred horses.

== History ==
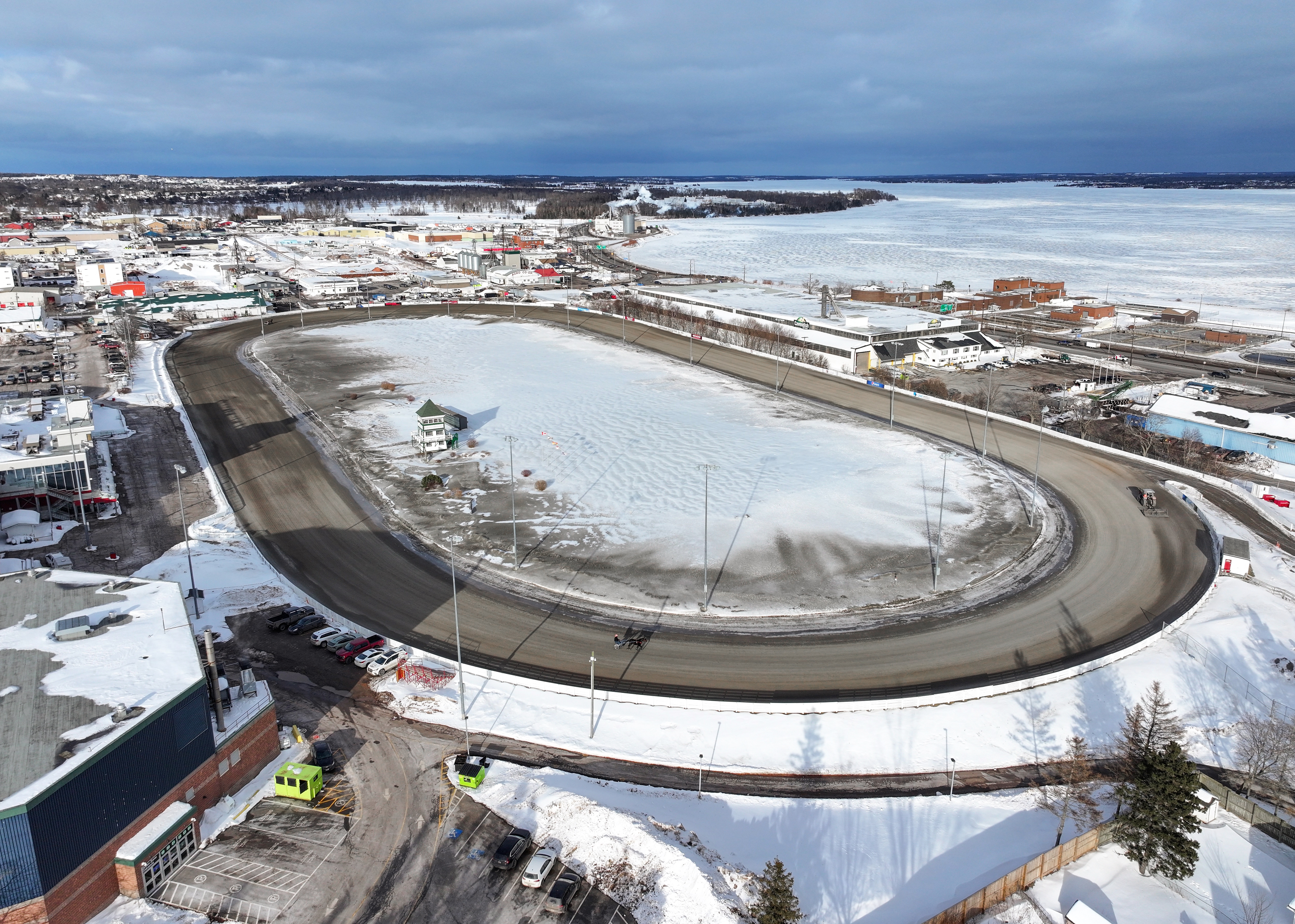
Red Shores Racetrack and Casino

The CDP opened on October 2, 1889, at a site along the west bank of the Hillsborough River in the rural community of Parkdale (amalgamated into Charlottetown in 1996). The facility soon established itself as one of the premiere race tracks in eastern Canada.

The track is an oval dirt surface standardbred race course. Its original judge's stand built in 1889 still stands on the inner field, having been restored in 1999. The starting gate, dating to 1948 and the first of its kind in Canada, was also restored to operational use in 1999.

During the third week of August, the CDP hosts "Old Home Week", Prince Edward Island's annual provincial agricultural exhibition running 15 racing programs over 9 days. A newer tradition since 1960, "Old Home Week" culminates in the running of the "Gold Cup and Saucer" finale at the end of the exhibition - a race which has drawn celebrities, royalty and locals alike. It is one of Canada's premiere harness racing events and draws record breaking crowds every year.

The CDP grandstand originally housed a restaurant and enclosed and open viewing areas for both winter and temperate season racing.

In 1990, the adjacent Charlottetown Civic Centre was built onto the CDP complex. A fire in the early 1990s among the wood-constructed horse stables led to the building of many new concrete stables, although urban development pressures around the CDP site may lead to horse owners being forced to practice their animals at another site on the outskirts of Charlottetown, leaving the CDP as primarily a race facility. Today, the track is used also as a training facility for many horses and employs over 50 trainers, grooms, and other support staff.

The roof of the CDP grandstand was heavily damaged by Hurricane Juan on September 29, 2003. This development is believed to have spurred the CDP's redevelopment by the provincial government into a so-called racino.

=== Red Shores Racetrack and Casino ===
Faced with declining revenues for race betting, the provincial government looked at options for redeveloping the CDP. Following damage to the facility by Hurricane Juan, the government entered into an agreement with the Atlantic Lottery Corporation and have been redeveloping the CDP with an improved track, lighting and a gaming facility containing Electronic Gaming Devices (EGD); such facilities are commonly termed racinos.

The gaming area is referred to as an Entertainment Centre, the name of the entire facility was referred to as the Charlottetown Driving Park Entertainment Centre (CDPEC) but in mid 2009 the names of the Charlottetown and Summerside facilities were rebranded as Red Shores Racetrack and Casino. The gaming floor in Charlottetown has 208 slot machines; including 40 stand-alone progressive slots, four linked progressives, a self-serve simulcast betting area, two blackjack tables, an Ultimate Texas Hold 'Em Poker table, and a Baccarat table. Summerside has 30 Video Lottery Terminals.

The CDPEC held the two biggest outdoor concerts ever on PEI. In 2006, hosting the Black Eyed Peas, Pussycat Dolls and others. Aerosmith and Cheap Trick, among others, then played the venue in the summer of 2007.

Today Red Shores racetrack and Casino calls itself "Atlantic Canada's Fastest Racetrack" and is the centerpiece of Prince Edward Island's harness racing industry.
