= Colonial Trot =

Harness stakes race for 3-year-old trotters

The Colonial
- Location: Philadelphia, Pennsylvania, U.S. (inaugural)
- Inaugurated: 1968
- Race type: Harness race for standardbred trotters

Race information
- Distance: 1 mile
- Surface: Dirt
- Track: Liberty Bell Park Racetrack (inaugural)
- Qualification: 3-year-olds

The Colonial Trot was a harness racing event for three-year-old standardbred trotters raced at a distance of one mile. The race was created in 1968, joining the Dexter Cup, the Yonkers Trot, the Hambletonian, and the Kentucky Futurity to form the "Big Five" races for three-year-old trotters.

== History ==
Edward J. Dougherty, then president of Liberty Bell Park Racetrack, organized The Colonial, the track's first $100,000 race. The event was created after the track in Philadelphia failed to secure the Hambletonian Stakes in the mid-1960s.

The Colonial Trot, a one-mile race for three-year-olds, was staged for the first time on September 14, 1968. The Colonials' debut marked a significant addition to Philadelphia's sports schedule. Co-sponsored by the Liberty Bell and William Penn Associations, it was the newest among the nine $100,000 harness races in the United States. The inaugural Colonial Trot featured Dart Hanover, Eric B., Nevele Pride, Master Yankee, Jostle, Keystone Spartan, and Snow Speed. The seven three-year-old trotters raced for a purse distribution of $50,000, $25,000, $12,000, $8,000, and $5,000 for the top five finishers. Stanley Dancer piloted Nevele Pride to victory in the 1968 event. The Colonial's first record was set at 1:59 by Nevele Pride.

When Philadelphia's Liberty Bell Park Racetrack went out of business in 1985, the 1986 Colonial Trot was carried over to Rosecroft Raceway in Fort Washington, Maryland. The Colonial became a stakes event under the Hambletonian Society and was considered the first step toward the Hambletonian Stakes.

Following Rosecraft Raceway's withdrawal due to financial difficulties, Foxboro Park paid $50,000 to host the 28th running of the event. The five-eighths-of-a-mile oval was selected by the Hambletonian Society over Hoosier Park, The Meadows, Pocono, and Meadowlands. Foxboro Park presented The Colonial on April 22, 1995. From 1996 onward, it was relocated to Woodbine Racetrack in Toronto, Ontario.

The Colonial was resumed in 2007 at Harrah's Philadelphia after a three-year hiatus. Ahead of the 2013 season, the stakes event was moved from Harrah's Philadelphia to Mohegan Sun at Pocono Downs, with the Pennsylvania Harness Horsemen's Association instituting a year-to-year alternation between the two tracks.

== Distances ==
At its inception in 1968, the Colonial Trot was raced over a distance of one mile.

== Locations ==
- 1968–1985: Liberty Bell Park Racetrack, Philadelphia, Pennsylvania, U.S.
- 1985–1994: Rosecroft Raceway, Fort Washington, Maryland, U.S.
- 1995: Foxboro Park, Foxborough, Massachusetts, U.S.
- 1996–2004: Woodbine Racetrack, Toronto, Ontario, Canada
- 2007-2012: Harrah's Philadelphia, Chester, Pennsylvania, U.S.
- 2013-: Pocono Downs, Wilkes-Barre, Pennsylvania, U.S.

== Records ==
Most wins by a driver

- 3 – Stanley Dancer (1968, 1972, 1985)

== Colonial Trot winners ==
Year	Winner	Driver	Trainer	Owner	Time	Notes
1968	Nevele Pride	Stanley Dancer	—	—	1:59	Stakes and world record; $50,803
1969	Lindy's Pride	Howard Beissinger	Howard Beissinger	Frank and Tom Antonacci (Lindy Farms)	2:00 2/5	$50,835
1970	Timothy T.	John F. Simpson Jr.	—	John F. Simpson Sr.	2:03 1/5	—
1971	Speedy Crown	Howard Beissinger	Howard Beissinger	Frank and Tom Antonacci	—	—
1972	Super Bowl	Stanley Dancer	—	—	—	—
1973	Flirth	Ralph N. Baldwin	Ralph N. Baldwin	—	2:01 2/5	$51,747
1974	Keystone Gabriel	Peter Haughton	—	—	2:01.3	—
1975	Meadow Bright	Del Miller	Del Miller	Del Miller (Hanover Shoe Farms)	2:02	First filly to win
1976	Armbro Regina	Joe O'Brien	—	Armstrong Brothers	2:00.4	$63,382
1977	Green Speed	Billy Haughton	—	—	1:58 4/5	Stakes record
1978	Florida Pro	George Sholty	—	—	1:58.2	Stakes record; $56,675
1979	Chiola Hanover	Jimmy Allen	—	—	2:02 1/5	—
1980	Noble Hustle	Doug Ackerman	—	—	2:00.1	$46,109
1981	Keystone Triton	Eldon Harner	—	Max Buran & Abe Farber	2:01	$66,182
1982	Jazz Cosmos	Mickey McNichol	—	—	1:58.1	$48,219
1983	Power Seat	Bill O'Donnell	—	Angelo & Orante C. Roncone	1:59.1	$75,000
1984	Why Not	Mickey McNichol	Joe Caraluzzi	—	1:59 1/5	—
1985	Piggvar	Stanley Dancer	—	—	1:58.0	Track record; $38,077
1986	Everglade Hanover	Hakan Wallner	Hakan Wallner	—	—	—
1987	Mack Lobell	John Campbell	—	—	—	—
1990	Jeanne's Somolli	Rod Allen	Carl Allen	L. Walter Houston	1:56.4	—
1991	Mr Chin	—	Oswaldo Formia	—	1:54.4	—
1992	Herschel Walker	—	Jan Johnson	Tomas Bertmark	1:58.3	—
1993	GEO Hanover	Per Henricksen	—	—	1:58.2	—
1994	Keystone Graham	Ron Pierce	—	—	2:00.3	—
1995	Keystone Galactic	Roger Hammer	Roger Hammer	Roger Hammer	1:58.2	—
1996	Tony Oaks	John Eades	John Eades	Antonio DeRossi	—	—
1997	Famously	Brian Allen	Jim Cruise Jr.	—	1:56.4	—
1998	Brylin Image	John Holmes	—	—	1:57 1/5	—
1998	Exactitude	Trevor Ritchie	—	—	1:57 1/5	—
