= Dexter Cup =

Harness stakes race for 3-year-old trotters

- Location: Freehold, New Jersey, U.S.
- Inaugurated: 1960
- Race type: Harness race for standardbred trotters

Race information
- Distance: 1 mile (1,609 metres or 8 furlongs)
- Surface: Dirt
- Track: Freehold Raceway
- Qualification: 3-year-olds

The Dexter Cup is a harness racing event for three-year-old standardbred trotters raced at a distance of one mile. The race was created in 1960.

== History ==
The Dexter Cup is a stakes race for three-year-old colts and geldings. Its companion race for three-year-old fillies is called the Lady Suffolk. The Dexter Cup was inaugurated in 1960 at Roosevelt Raceway in Westbury, New York. The inaugural $60,000 Dexter Cup was held on September 17, 1960. Named in memory of Dexter, the race honors one of the foremost trotters of the 19th century.

The Dexter Cup is traditionally considered the first leg of the "Big Five" trotting stakes, which also include the Colonial Trot, Yonkers Trot, Hambletonian Stakes, and Kentucky Futurity. It is held annually as the opening stakes event of the Grand Circuit season for three-year-old male trotters eligible to compete in the Hambletonian.

The Dexter Cup was held at the now-defunct Roosevelt Raceway from 1960 to 1987. At Roosevelt Raceway, The Dexter developed into the richest harness race of all time with a value of $183,463 in 1967. It was relocated to Yonkers Raceway for the 1988 season. In November 1991, Freehold Raceway signed a contract with the Hambletonian Society to host the Dexter Cup and the Lady Suffolk trots for the first time in 1992. The closure of Freehold Raceway at the end of 2024 led to the Dexter Cup being reassigned to The Meadowlands Grand Circuit program in 2025. The format was changed to eliminate eliminations and a final, instead splitting the race into divisions.

Notable Dexter Cup winners include the world champions Armbro Goal, Joie De Vie, Defiant Yankee, Colt Comfort, Songcan, Lindy's Pride, Nevele Pride, and Carlisle. Five horses have captured both the Dexter Cup and the Hambletonian Stakes: Speedy Scot (1963), Nevele Pride (1968), Lindy's Pride (1969), Armbro Goal (1988), and American Winner (1993).

== Distances ==
The Dexter Cup Trot was originally raced over one mile when inaugurated in 1960.

== Locations ==
- 1960–1987: Roosevelt Raceway, Westbury, New York, U.S.
- 1988–1991: Yonkers Raceway, Yonkers, New York, U.S.
- 1992–2024: Freehold Raceway, Freehold, New Jersey, U.S.
- 2025–present: The Meadowlands, East Rutherford, New Jersey, U.S.

== Records ==
Most wins by a driver

- 4 – Stanley Dancer (1964, 1968, 1971, 1986)

Most wins by a trainer

- 3 – Ake Svanstedt (2016, 2021, 2023)

Stakes record (1 mile)

- 1:53.4 – Hard Seven (2025)

== Dexter Cup winners ==
Year	Winner	Driver	Trainer	Owner	Time	Notes
1960	Quick Song	Ralph N. Baldwin	Ralph N. Baldwin	Castleton Farm	2:10 2/5	World trotting record
1961	Matastar	Harry Pownall	—	Arden Homestead Stable	2:10 1/5	World trotting record
1962	Lord Gordon	John Patterson	John Patterson	Leonard J. Buck/Allwood Stable	—	
1963	Speedy Scot	Ralph N. Baldwin	Ralph N. Baldwin	Castleton Farm	—	
1964	Dartmouth	Stanley Dancer	—	Castleton Farm	2:08 4/5	—
1965	Armbro Flight	Joe O'Brien	Joe O'Brien	Elgin, Ted, and Charles Armstrong	2:03 3/5	$39,943
1966	Carlisle	Billy Haughton	—	—	—	
1967	Flamboyant	Billy Haughton	—	—	2:04 3/5	$91,731
1968	Nevele Pride	Stanley Dancer	Stanley Dancer	Nevele Acres & Louis Resnick	2:02 2/5	
1969	Lindy's Pride	Howard Beissinger	Howard Beissinger	Frank and Tom Antonacci (Lindy Farms)	2:00 3/5	
1970	Marlu Pride	Hervé Filion	Hervé Filion	August J. Portanova	2:01 2/5	Stakes record
1971	Quick Pride	Stanley Dancer	Stanley Dancer	Florida Stables	2:03	$53,843
1972	Songcan	George Sholty	Don Prussack	Nevele Acres & Don Hy Stable, Inc.	2:02 4/5	—
1973	Knightly Way	John F. Simpson Jr.	John F. Simpson Jr.	Clarence Gaines	2:01.3	—
1974	Surge Hanover	William Wellwood	William Wellwood	William Wellwood	2:03 4/5	$56,190
1975	Songflori	Delvin Miller	Delvin Miller	Del Miller, John F. Simpson Jr., & the Messenger Stables	—	
1976	Soothsayer	Delvin Miller	Mike Crocco	Mike Crocco	2:02 4/5	$83,145
1977	Cold Comfort	Peter Haughton	Billy Haughton	H.P.H. Stable	—	$83,328; First father-son team to win
1978	Brisco Hanover	Jim Miller	Jim Miller	—	Mel Barr	—
1979	Chiola Hanover	Jimmy Allen	Bill Vaughn	Michael & Allan Chasanoff	2:02 2/5	$87,613
1980	Nevele Impulse	Dick Macomber	Dick Macomber	Hans Enggren	2:02 2/5	—
1981	Defiant Yankee	Howard Beissinger	—	—	2:01	Track record tie
1982	Mystic Park	Frank O'Mara	Frank O'Mara	—	2:01 2/5	$82,073
1983	Joie De Vie	Buddy Gilmour	Ned Martin	—	2:01 4/5	$131,695
1984	Speed Merchant	Anthony Quartarolo	Anthony Quartarolo	—	1:59 2/5	Track record tie
1985	Master Willie	Sören Nordin	—	—	2:00	—
1986	Mangrove	Stanley Dancer	—	—	2:00 2/5	—
1987	Crowns Best	John Campbell	—	—	—	$83,981
1988	Armbro Goal	John Campbell	Jan Johnson	Jimmy Plate	1:54 4/5	$110,683
1990	Royal Troubadour	Carl Allen	Carl Allen	Carl Allen	1:58.3	Stakes record
1991	Crowns Invitation	Michel Lachance	Jerry Riordan	Lou Guida	1:54 4/5	—
1992	McCluckey	Jack Moiseyev	Joe Holloway	—	2:00 3/5	—
1993	American Winner	Ron Pierce	Per Eriksson	—	—	—
1994	Mr Lavec	Jimmy Takter	Jimmy Takter	—	1:58.2	Stakes record
1995	Super Wally	Rod Allen	Ed Perry	Loren Houston	—	—
1996	Armbro Ogen	Jack Moiseyev	Brett Pelling	Brett Pelling & Peter & Gail McCann	—	$75,872.50
1997	Armbro Plato	Ray Schnittker	Ray Schnittker	Ray Schnittker, Seal Stable, Earl Scheelar, & Ron Kelkenberg	1:58 4/5	—
1998	Trade Balance	Ron Pierce	—	—	2:02.2	—
1999	Pearsall Hanover	Mickey McNichol	—	Wildenstein Stable	1:59	$79,575
2000	Ambro Trick	Ray Schnittker	Paul Doherty	Ray Schnittker, Seal Stable, Earl Schleer, & Kelks Inc.	1:57 4/5	Stakes record
2001	SJ's Caviar	Robert Blanton Jr.	Belinda Blanton	Solomon, Bartling and Kosmos Horse Breeders	1:56 1/5	Stakes record
2002	Trainforthefuture	Michel Lachance	Robert Macintosh	—	1:59.1	—
2003	CR V Eight	Catello Manzi	Lars Nordin	—	1:59.1	—
2004	Beissinger Hanover	Michel Lachance	Ron Gurfein	—	1:57 1/5	—
2005	Lindy Five Hundred	George Brennan	Paul Doherty	Jones For President, KR Breeding, and Edward Pachula	1:59.1	—
2006	A Rod	George Brennan	Paul Doherty	Earl Schleer, the Kelk family, & Ray Schnittker	1:58.1	—
2007	Manfinity	George Brennan	Larry Rathbone	—	1:58.2	—
2008	Holiday Credit	Ron Pierce	Jimmy Takter	—	1:56.3	—
2009	Anders Bluestone	Tim Tetrick	Jimmy Takter	—	1:55.3	Stakes record
2010	Flex The Muscle	David Miller	Ray Schnittker	—	1:56.2	Schnittker's fifth victory
2011	Ice Machine	David Miller	Charlie Norris	—	1:57.3	—
2012	Not Afraid	Ron Pierce	Jimmy Takter	—	1:55.4	—
2013	Celebrity Maserati	Tom Jackson	Susanne Strandqvist	—	1:58.3	—
2014	Sumatra	Brian Sears	Tom Fanning	—	1:57.4	—
2015	Habitat	Yannick Gingras	Ron Burke	—	1:56.4	—
2016	Dante	Ake Svanstadt	Ake Svanstedt	Courant AB of Sweden	1:59.4	—
2017	Lord Cromwell	John Campbell	Ed Hart	Carolyn & Irv Atherton	1:55	Stakes record
2018	Lindy's Big Bang	David Miller	Richard Norman	—	1:56.1	—
2019	Osterc	Yannick Gingras	Per Engblom	Christina Takter	1:57.0	—
2020	No races					
2021	Incommunicado	Yannick Gingras	Ake Svanstedt	Knutsson Trotting Inc., Little E LLC, Arthur Geiger, & David Stolz	1:56 3/5	—
2022	Brave By Design	Joe Bongiorno	Jennifer Bongiorno	Brave By Design Stable	1:57.2	—
2023	Khaosan Road	Scott Zeron	Ake Svanstedt	Knutsson Trotting Inc. & Little E LLC	1:57.4	—
2024	Sir Pinocchio	Jason Bartlett	Ed Hart	Carolyn & Irv Atherton	1:56.2	—
2025	Hard Seven	Todd McCarthy	Nancy Takter	Let It Ride Stables, Maurice Chodash, & Boca Racing LLC	1:53.4	
