= 1969 in sports =

1969 in sports describes the year's events in world sport.

== Alpine skiing ==
- Alpine Skiing World Cup:
  - Men's overall champion: Karl Schranz, Austria
  - Women's overall champion: Gertrud Gabl, Austria

== American football ==
- Super Bowl III: the New York Jets (AFL) won 16−7 over the Baltimore Colts (NFL)
  - Location: Miami Orange Bowl
  - Attendance: 75,389
  - MVP: Joe Namath, QB (New York)
  - Game note: Super Bowl is remembered for New York quarterback Joe Namath "guaranteeing" a victory.
- Rose Bowl (1968 season)
  - The Ohio State Buckeyes won 27–16 over the Southern California Trojans to win the college football national championship
- College football's centennial year was marked by racial strife.
- September 28 – Minnesota Vikings' Quarterback Joe Kapp became the last player to throw seven touchdowns in a single game.
- November 22 – College Football – Michigan upsets #1 ranked Ohio State 24-12 sending Michigan to the Rose Bowl
- December 6 – College Football – #1 Texas beats #2 Arkansas 15–14 in the then Game of the Century. Texas would remain #1 for the rest of the season and were the AP 1969 National Champions following their Cotton Bowl win.

== Association football ==
- September 26 – the Bolivian soccer team is killed in a plane crash near La Paz, Bolivia
- European Cup – A.C. Milan 4–1 Ajax
- Inter-Cities Fairs Cup – Newcastle United defeat Újpesti Dózsa 6–2 on aggregate
- England – First Division Champions: Leeds United
- England – FA Cup – Manchester City won 1–0 over Leicester City
- Germany – Bundesliga – Bayern Munich
- Italy – Serie A: Fiorentina
- Scotland – First Division Champions: Celtic
- Scotland – FA Cup: Celtic won 4–0 over Rangers
- Spain – La Liga: Real Madrid
- Ecuador – Ecuadorian Serie A Champions: LDU Quito

== Athletics ==
- September – 1969 European Championships in Athletics held in Athens

== Australian rules football ==
- Victorian Football League
  - April 12: Carlton become the first team to score 200 points in a VFL match when they kick 30.30 (210) to Hawthorn 12.10 (82). Alex Jesaulenko kicks 6.12 (48).
  - Richmond wins the 73rd VFL Premiership (Richmond 12.13 (85) d Carlton 8.12 (60))
  - Brownlow Medal awarded to Kevin Murray (Fitzroy)

== Bandy ==
- 1969 Bandy World Championship is held in Sweden and won by Soviet Union.

== Baseball ==
- The American League expands to 12 teams, adding the Kansas City Royals and Seattle Pilots, and the National League expands to 12 teams, adding the Montreal Expos and San Diego Padres.
- Due to expansion, Major League Baseball creates four divisions, with two in each league.
- March 1 – Mickey Mantle of the New York Yankees announces his retirement.
- April 14 – Montreal Expos outfielder Mack Jones hit a three-run home run and two-run triple that highlighted an 8–7 win over the St. Louis Cardinals in the Expos' first home victory as a franchise at Jarry Park. Jones' blast was also the first MLB home run hit outside the United States.
- July 20 – San Francisco Giants pitcher Gaylord Perry, some six years after his manager quipped, "They'll put a man on the Moon before he hits a home run", hits the first home run of his career just hours after Neil Armstrong lands on the Moon.
- World Series – the New York Mets win 4 games to 1 over the Baltimore Orioles.

== Basketball ==
- NCAA Men's Basketball Championship –
  - UCLA wins 92–72 over Purdue
- NBA Finals –
  - Boston Celtics won 4 games to 3 over the Los Angeles Lakers
- 1969 ABA Finals –
  - Oakland Oaks defeat Indiana Pacers 4 games to 1

== Boxing ==
- June 23 – Joe Frazier scored a 7th-round TKO over Jerry Quarry.
- August 26 – José Nápoles retained the World Welterweight Championship in a 15-round decision over Emile Griffith.
- August 31 – death of Rocky Marciano (45), Italian-American World Heavyweight boxing champion, in an air crash

== Canadian football ==
- Grey Cup – Ottawa Rough Riders won 29–11 over the Saskatchewan Roughriders.
- Vanier Cup – Manitoba Bisons won 24–15 over the McGill Redmen

== Cricket ==
- February 20 – Australia defeat the West Indies at Sydney in the Fifth Test Match to win the series 3-1
- March 8 Rioting stops the final match of England's tour of Pakistan on the third day. The match is abandoned and the series drawn.
- July 15 – England defeat the West Indies at Headingley in the Third Test Match to win the series 2-0
- August 26 – England defeat New Zealand at The Oval in the Third Test Match to win the series 2-0
- Learie Constantine becomes the first cricketer and the first person of Afro-Caribbean descent to be given a life peerage.

== Cycling ==
- Giro d'Italia won by Felice Gimondi of Italy
- Tour de France – Eddy Merckx of Belgium
- UCI Road World Championships – Men's road race – Harm Ottenbros of Netherlands

== Figure skating ==
- World Figure Skating Championships –
  - Men's champion: Tim Wood, United States
  - Ladies' champion: Gabrielle Seyfert, Germany
  - Pair skating champions: Irina Rodnina & Alexei Ulanov, Soviet Union
  - Ice dancing champions: Diane Towler & Bernard Ford, Great Britain

== Golf ==
Men's professional

- Masters Tournament – George Archer
- U.S. Open – Orville Moody
- British Open – Tony Jacklin
- PGA Championship – Raymond Floyd
- PGA Tour money leader – Frank Beard – $164,707
- Ryder Cup – United States and Britain tied 16 all in team golf.

Men's amateur

- British Amateur – Michael Bonallack
- U.S. Amateur – Steve Melnyk

Women's professional

- LPGA Championship – Betsy Rawls
- U.S. Women's Open – Donna Caponi
- LPGA Tour money leader – Carol Mann – $49,152

== Harness racing ==
- United States Pacing Triple Crown races –
  1. Cane Pace – Kat Byrd
  2. Little Brown Jug – Laverne Hanover
  3. Messenger Stakes – Bye Bye Sam
- Lindy's Pride won the United States Trotting Triple Crown races –
  1. Hambletonian – Lindy's Pride
  2. Yonkers Trot – Lindy's Pride
  3. Kentucky Futurity – Lindy's Pride
- Australian Inter Dominion Harness Racing Championship –
  - Pacers: Richmond Lass

== Horse racing ==
- February 11 – Diana Crump becomes first woman jockey to ride against men in USA racing
- February 22 – Barbara Jo Rubin becomes the first female winner of a USA race

Steeplechases

- Cheltenham Gold Cup – What A Myth
- Grand National – Highland Wedding

Flat races

- Australia – Melbourne Cup won by Rain Lover
- Canada – Queen's Plate won by Jumpin Joseph
- France – Prix de l'Arc de Triomphe won by Levmoss
- Ireland – Irish Derby Stakes won by Prince Regent
- English Triple Crown Races:
  1. 2,000 Guineas Stakes – Right Tack
  2. The Derby – Blakeney
  3. St. Leger Stakes – Intermezzo
- United States Triple Crown Races:
  1. Kentucky Derby – Majestic Prince
  2. Preakness Stakes – Majestic Prince
  3. Belmont Stakes – Arts and Letters

== Ice hockey ==
- Art Ross Trophy as the NHL's leading scorer during the regular season: Phil Esposito, Boston Bruins
- Hart Memorial Trophy – for the NHL's Most Valuable Player: Phil Esposito, Boston Bruins
- Stanley Cup – Montreal Canadiens won 4 games to 0 over the St. Louis Blues
- World Hockey Championship
  - Men's champion: Soviet Union defeated Sweden
- NCAA Men's Ice Hockey Championship – University of Denver Pioneers defeat Cornell University Big Red 4–3 in Colorado Springs, Colorado
- Goalie Karen Koch is signed to a professional contract with the Marquette Iron Rangers to become the first woman to play professional hockey in North America, if not the world.

== Rugby league ==
- 1969 Kangaroo tour of New Zealand
- 1969–70 European Rugby League Championship
- 1969 New Zealand rugby league season
- 1969 NSWRFL season
- 1968–69 Northern Rugby Football League season / 1969–70 Northern Rugby Football League season

== Rugby union ==
- 75th Five Nations Championship series is won by Wales

== Snooker ==
- World Snooker Championship reverts to a knockout format. John Spencer beats Gary Owen 37-24

== Tennis ==
- June 6 – death of Rafael Osuna, Mexican tennis player, in an air crash
- June 21 – death of Maureen Connolly (34), first winner of the women's Grand Slam
- Australian Rod Laver, one of only two men to ever win the Grand Slam in tennis wins it for the second time
- Grand Slam in tennis men's results:
  1. Australian Open – Rod Laver (Australia)
  2. French Open – Rod Laver
  3. Wimbledon championships – Rod Laver
  4. U.S. Open – Rod Laver
- Grand Slam in tennis women's results:
  1. Australian Open – Margaret Court
  2. French Open – Margaret Court
  3. Wimbledon championships – Ann Haydon-Jones
  4. U.S. Open – Margaret Court
- Davis Cup – United States wins 5–0 over Romania in world tennis.

== Awards ==
- ABC's Wide World of Sports Athlete of the Year: Mario Andretti, race car driver
- Associated Press Male Athlete of the Year – Tom Seaver, Major League Baseball
- Associated Press Female Athlete of the Year – Debbie Meyer, Swimming
