= Speedy Somolli =

American-bred Standardbred racehorse

- Breed: Standardbred
- Sire: Speedy Crown
- Grandsire: Speedy Scot
- Dam: Somolli
- Damsire: Star's Pride
- Sex: Stallion
- Foaled: 1975
- Died: 2007
- Country: United States
- Colour: Bay
- Owner: Ann Beissinger; Barbara Mumma
- Trainer: Howard Beissinger
- Record: 1:55
- Earnings: $427,550

Major wins
- Yonkers Trot (1978); Hambletonian Stakes (1978)

Awards
- Two-Year-Old Trotter of the Year (1977)

Honours
- United States Harness Racing Hall of Fame (2003)

Speedy Somolli (April 17, 1975 – 2007) was an American standardbred racehorse who won the 1978 Hambletonian Stakes.

== Origin and early years ==
Speedy Somolli was foaled in 1975 at Robert and Barbara Mumma's family farm in Harrisburg, Pennsylvania.

Speedy Somolli was out of Somolli, a Star's Pride mare picked by Howard Beissinger for Barbara Mumma after she proved unsuitable for racing and was bred to Speedy Crown.

As a yearling, he was brought to Lexington, Kentucky by Howard Beissinger to be broken to harness.

== Racing career ==
=== Two-year-old season ===
As a two-year-old, Speedy Somolli won 10 of his 16 starts, banking $65,146.

He broke a 10-year-old Illinois State Fair record with a sub-2:00 mile in winning the $39,000 Greyhound Trot on August 17, 1977. He collected $13,700 after he covered the mile oval in 1:59.3 in the final heat, surpassing the 2:00.1 mark set by Nevele Pride in 1967. He became the first two-year-old trotter ever to break the two-minute barrier at the Illinois State Fairgrounds Racetrack.

On September 2, 1977, the Beissinger-trained trotter participated in the Castleton Farm Stakes at the Du Quoin Fairgrounds. In the first heat, Speedy Somolli trotted 1:57 2/5, breaking the 10-year-old world record held by Nevele Pride, which was then beaten in the following heat.

He was selected as the Two-Year-Old Trotter of the Year in December 1977 by the United States Harness Writers Association.

=== Three-year-old season ===
At three years old, Speedy Somolli won half of his 20 races and was voted overall Trotter of the Year.

Before 20,000 fans, Speedy Somolli won the 24th Yonkers Trot in August 1978, collecting a share of $116,797. It marked the first of the three races that formed the Trotting Triple Crown for three-year-olds.

On September 2, 1978, he competed in the 53rd annual Hambletonian Stakes at the DuQuoin State Fair, with Howard Beissinger driving. Speedy Somolli captured the first heat in 1:55, a world record for the fastest mile by a trotter of any age. After losing the second heat, Speedy Somolli captured the third in 1:57 to win the $120,640 first prize. The combined time of the three heats set a world record for the one-mile distance.

By winning the first two legs, the Hambletonian winner was eligible for the Kentucky Futurity in Lexington, the last leg of the Triple Crown of Trotting. At The Red Mile, Speedy Somolli went off stride in both heats of the Kentucky Futurity, ending his bid for the Trotting Triple Crown. Throughout his career, he had a history of breaking stride in races.

== Stud record ==
At the end of the racing season in October 1977, the two-year-old world champion was sold to Lana Lobell Farms, one of the largest horse farms in the United States. Speedy Somolli was syndicated as a stallion for $2,000,000. When he was retired to stud, he began with a $5,000 stud fee, which later climbed to $20,000.

In 1984, the United States Trotting Association listed Speedy Somolli as the nation's second-leading sire by average offspring earnings ($33,459).

After eleven years at Lana Lobell Farms, Speedy Somolli was sold to European interests in 1989.

== Death ==
Speedy Somolli died in 2007 in Germany.

== Legacy ==
Speedy Somolli descended from champions: his father, Speedy Crown, won the Hambletonian Stakes in 1971, and his grandfather, Speedy Scot, in 1963. Speedy Somolli was the first horse whose sire and grandsire were both Hambletonian champions.

Speedy Somolli was inducted into the United States Harness Racing Hall of Fame in 2003.

== See also ==
- List of racehorses
