= International Trot =

- Location: Yonkers, New York, USA
- Race type: Harness race for Standardbred trotters

Race information
- Distance: 1¼ miles (2011 metres or 10 furlongs)
- Surface: Dirt, 1/2 mile oval
- Track: Yonkers Raceway
- Qualification: 3yo & up
- Purse: $1,000,000 (2022)

The International Trot is a harness racing event held in the New York City area that aimed to appeal to a mix of United States and international entrants. The inaugural event was held at Roosevelt Raceway in Westbury, New York in 1959, and was held at the track until its closure in 1988. Thereafter, the race moved to Yonkers Raceway in Yonkers, New York. The initial running was held at a distance of 1.5 miles (2.4 km), with subsequent races held at a distance of 1.25 miles (2.01 km).

In advance of its third running in 1961, The New York Times described that "There are many harness racing stakes that are older and quite a few that are richer, but there is none, that for glamour, pageantry, excitement and wild wagering matches the Roosevelt International Trot."

Yonkers Raceway announced in 2014 that they would return the International Trot to the racing schedule after a hiatus of almost 20 years. With a purse of $1 million, the 2015 International Trot was won by Papagayo E, giving Norway their first win in the race.

The International Trot was not held in 2020 or 2021 due to travel restrictions imposed as a result of the COVID-19 pandemic.

== Race history ==
=== 1959 ===
In 1959, a trotter from France named Jamin was scheduled to run in the inaugural International Trot at Roosevelt Raceway. The track's publicist, Joe Goldstein spread the word that the horse's chances were affected by the loss of over 150 pounds of artichokes that had been impounded, and then misplaced, by the United States Department of Agriculture at Idlewild Airport. Goldstein placed ads in The New York Times and New York Herald Tribune that read "French Trotter Needs Artichokes. Can You Help?", including a phone number of Roosevelt Raceway. Newspapers gave the story extensive play, with locals bring their backyard-grown artichokes to the track and United Airlines flying artichokes in from Watsonville, California, the artichoke capital of America. The horse was energized after eating the artichokes, or so Goldstein said, and went on to win the race in front of a crowd of 45,000. Jamin held on to win in front of a crowd of 48,000 spectators, with the Italian horse Tornese in second by half a length and betting favorite Trader Horn, an American entry, in third, 2¼ lengths out of second. Jamin ran the mile-and-a-half in 3:08.6.

=== 1960 ===
Both first-time champion Jamin and Ruder Konge of Denmark dropped out of the 1960 race. The 9-year old Hairos II, driven by Willem Geersen, went on to win the mile-and-a-quarter second running in a field of seven in a time of 2:34, defeating the Italian horse Crevalcore by a half-length, with the American entry Silver Song, a 9-5 favorite, in third by a half-length behind Crevalcore. The crowd of 54,861 set a record, breaking the prior mark of 50,337 set at the track in August 1957.

=== 1961 ===
Hairos II was unable to defend his title in the 1961 race, after suffering a bowed tendon during a win in a race in The Hague. At the 1961 International Trot, a French horse named Kracovie that had won that year's European circuit was missing a stablemate, either a mountain sheep or a goat, that could not be brought into the United States due to quarantine regulations, and would not eat in the absence of its companion. As described by George Vecsey in the Times, "The entertainer Tina Louise just happened to have a goat in her Manhattan apartment. Wearing a low-cut dress, she and her agent and the goat paid a mission of mercy to Roosevelt." Despite the publicity, and the goat, Kracovie lost the race to Su Mac Lad, with Tie Silk in third. Su Mac Lad, driven by Stanley Dancer, finished in a time of 2:34.4 in driving rain and a sloppy track in front of 28,105 racing fans.

=== 1962 ===
The lightly regarded Canadian horse Tie Silk, who had finished in third the previous year and sixth the year before, won the $50,000 race in front of a crowd of 53,279. Six-year-old Tie Silk, driven by Keith Waples, won in a time of 2:34.2, with favorite and returning winner Su Mac Lad in second and world record holder Porterhouse in third. The betting handle of $2,793,596 set a world record for a harness racing program, breaking the prior record set at the second running of the International Trot.

=== 1963 ===
Su Mac Lad, who had won in 1961 but dropped to second in 1962, returned to win the 1963 running in a seven-horse field, before a crowd of 41,197 of what The New York Times called "screaming harness racing buffs". The Dutch horse Martini II came in second, with returning champion Tie Silk in third. Driven by Stanley Dancer, Su Mac Lad paid bettors $2.90 to win in tying a world record at the 1¼-mile distance with a time of 2:32.6. The 9-to-20 favorite came in a half-length ahead of Martini II who in turn beat Tie Silk by 7.5 lengths. The $25,000 taken home by Su Mac Lad brought his career winnings to $687,549, the most of any pacer or trotter as of that date.

=== 1988 ===
After the demise of Roosevelt Raceway in 1988, the race was relocated to Yonkers Raceway. Mack Lobell won the first Yonkers edition of the race in a track record time of 2:30 4/5.

== Locations ==
- Roosevelt Raceway (1959-1988)
- Yonkers Raceway (1988-1993, 1995, 2015–present)

== Historical race events ==
The inaugural race of 1959 was run at a distance of 1 1/2 miles after which it was set at its current 1 1/4 miles.

In 1983, France's Ideal du Gazeau became the only horse to ever win the International Trot three times.

Lutin d'Isigny, another French horse, won the 1984 race in a then World Record time of 2:31 flat. His winning margin of 7 lengths was the largest in the 26-year history of the event.

On October 25, 2014, Yonkers Raceway ran the International Trot Preview, a precursor to the return of the International Trot in 2015. The race was won by Natural Herbie for owner/trainer/driver Verlin Yoder.

== Wins by country ==
The winners of the International Trot have come from 8 different countries.

- United States: 15
- France: 13
- Sweden: 3
- Canada: 3
- Italy: 3
- Norway: 2
- Denmark: 1
- Netherlands: 1

== Records ==
Most wins by a horse

- 3 – Ideal du Gazeau (1981, 1982, 1983)

Most wins by a driver

- 3 – Jean-René Gougeon (1968, 1969, 1971)
- 3 – Eugène Lefèvre (1981, 1982, 1983)

Most wins by a trainer

- 3 – Jean-René Gougeon (1968, 1969, 1971)
- 3 – Eugène Lefèvre (1981, 1982, 1983)

Stakes record (1 ¼ miles)

- 2:30 0/0 – Lutin d'Isigny (1984) at Roosevelt
- 2:22 1/5 – Twister Bi (2017) at Yonkers

== International Trot winners ==
Year	Winner	Age	Driver	Trainer	Owner	Time	Purse	Country	Ref
2024	Jiggy Jog	5	Dexter Dunn	Ake Svanstedt	Steve Stewart, John Lengacher and Hickory Hollow Stables	2:25	$1,000,000	(Sweden)	
2023	Vivid Wise As	9	Matthieu Abrivard	Alessandro Gocciadoro	Bivans SRL and Bruni Racing Team AB	2:23.1/5	$1,000,000	(Italy)	
2022	Cokstile	9	Vincenzo Dell’Annunziata	Mattia Orlando	Scuderia Santese SRL	2:23	$1,000,000	(Norway)	
2020-2021	No Race								
2019	Zacon Gio	4	Roberto Vecchione	Holger Ehlert	Franco Giuseppe	2:24 1/5	$1,000,000	(Italy)	
2018	Cruzado Dela Noche	6	Brian Sears	Marcus Melander	Courant Stable	2:24 3/5	$1,000,000	(Sweden)	
2017	Twister Bi	5	Christoffer Eriksson	Jerry Riordan	Ciccarelli Pasquale	2:22 1/5	$1,000,000	(Italy)	
2016	Resolve	6	Ake Svanstedt	Ake Svanstedt	Hans Enggren	2:23 4/5	$1,000,000	(United States)	
2015	Papagayo E	5	Ulf Ohlsson	Jan K. Waaler	Tom Andersen & Claes Sjolin	2:26 0/0	$1,000,000	(Norway)	
1996-2014	No Race								
1995	His Majesty	5	Stefan Melander	Catarina Lundström	Annelie Henriksson	2:26 0/0	$300,000	(Sweden)	
1994	No Race								
1993	Giant Force	4	John F. Patterson, Jr.	Per Eriksson	Spar J Stable (Katz Family) & Theodore Gewertz	2:27 0/0	$500,000	(United States)	
1992	Atas Fighter L.	7	Torbjorn Jansson	Torbjorn Jansson	Écurie Travhäst	2:31 1/5	$500,000	(Sweden)	
1991	Peace Corps	5	Stig H. Johansson	Stig H. Johansson	Stall Pieder (Bjorn Pettersson)	2:28 3/5	$450,000	(United States)	
1990	Reve d'Udon	7	Yves Dreux	Bernard Desmontils	Bernard Desmontils	2:28 3/5	$450,000	(France)	
1989	Kit Lobell	4	Berndt O. Lindstedt	Jan Johnson	Johan Dieden	2:31 1/5	$350,000	(United States)	
1988	Mack Lobell	4	John Campbell	Charles Sylvester	One More Time Stable (Louis P. Guida), et al. & Fair Winds Farm	2:30 4/5	$200,000	(United States)	
1987	Callit	6	Karl O. Johansson	Karl O. Johansson	Christfam AB	2:33 4/5	$200,000	(Sweden)	
1986	Habib	5	Ulf Thoresen	Roger Walmann		2:33 0/0	$250,000	(Denmark)	
1985	Lutin d'Isigny	8	Jean-Paul André	Maurice G. Corniere	Maurice G. Corniere	2:31 0/0	$250,000	(France)	
1984	Lutin d'Isigny	7	Jean-Paul André	Maurice G. Corniere	Maurice G. Corniere	2:30 0/0	$250,000	(France)	
1983	Ideal du Gazeau	9	Eugène Lefèvre	Eugène Lefèvre	Pierre-Jean Morin	2:35 2/5	$250,000	(France)	
1982	Ideal du Gazeau	8	Eugène Lefèvre	Eugène Lefèvre	Pierre-Jean Morin	2:36 0/0	$250,000	(France)	
1981	Ideal du Gazeau	7	Eugène Lefèvre	Eugène Lefèvre	Pierre-Jean Morin	2:32 3/5	$250,000	(France)	
1980	Classical Way	4	John F. Simpson, Jr.	John F. Simpson, Jr.	Clarence F. Gaines	2:35 2/5	$250,000	(United States)	
1979	Doublemint	4	Peter Haughton	Billy Haughton	John Lavezzo	2:38 3/5	$200,000	(United States)	
1978	Cold Comfort	4	Peter Haughton	Billy Haughton	H.P.H. Stable	2:31 3/5	$200,000	(United States)	
1977	Delfo	8	Sergio Brighenti	Sergio Brighenti	Enrico Tosonotti	2:34 3/5	$200,000	(Italy)	
1976	Equileo	6	Bernard Froger	Pierre Désiré Allaire	Pierre Désiré Allaire & Alain Delon	2:33 3/5	$200,000	(France)	
1975	Savoir	7	Del Insko	Mel Smorra	Allwood Stables (Leonard J. & Helen R. Buck)	2:32 1/5	$200,000	(United States)	
1974	Delmonica Hanover	5	John Chapman	Delvin Miller	Delvin Miller & W. Arnold Hanger	2:34 4/5	$200,000	(United States)	
1973	Delmonica Hanover	4	John Chapman	Delvin Miller	Delvin Miller & W. Arnold Hanger	2:34 2/5	$150,000	(United States)	
1972	Speedy Crown	4	Howard Beissinger	Howard Beissinger	Crown Stable, Inc. (Frank & Thomas Antonacci)	2:35 1/5	$125,000	(United States)	
1971	Une de Mai	7	Jean-René Gougeon	Jean-René Gougeon	Count Pierre de Montesson	2:34 4/5	$125,000	(France)	
1970	Fresh Yankee	7	Joe O'Brien	Joe O'Brien	Duncan A. MacDonald	2:35 1/5	$125,000	(Canada)	
1969	Une de Mai	5	Jean-René Gougeon	Jean-René Gougeon	Count Pierre de Montesson	2:33 2/5	$100,000	(France)	
1968	Roquepine	7	Jean-René Gougeon	Jean-René Gougeon	Henri Levesque	2:38 3/5	$100,000	(France)	
1967	Roquepine	6	Henri Levesque	Henri Levesque	Henri Levesque	2:43 4/5	$100,000	(France)	
1966	Armbro Flight	4	Joe O'Brien	Joe O'Brien	Armstrong Bros.	2:38 3/5	$100,000	(Canada)	
1965	Pluvier III	6	Gunnar Nordin	Gunnar Nordin	Goesta Valentin	2:36 0/0	$100,000	(France)	
1964	Speedy Scot	4	Ralph N. Baldwin	Ralph N. Baldwin	Castleton Farm	2:32 3/5	$50,000	(United States)	
1963	Su Mac Lad	9	Stanley Dancer	Stanley Dancer	Irving W. Berkemeyer	2:32 3/5	$50,000	(United States)	
1962	Tie Silk	6	Keith Waples	Keith Waples	Miron Farms (Adrien & Gerard Miron)	2:34 1/5	$50,000	(Canada)	
1961	Su Mac Lad	7	Stanley Dancer	Stanley Dancer	Irving W. Berkemeyer	2:34 2/5	$50,000	(United States)	
1960	Hairos II	9	Willem Geersen	Willem Geersen	Andries Voordouw	2:34 0/0	$50,000	(Netherlands)	
1959	Jamin	6	Jean Riaud	Jean Riaud	Camille Olry-Roederer	3:08 3/5	$50,000	(France)	
