= Joe Goldstein =

Herbert Joseph Goldstein (c. 1928 – February 13, 2009) was an American publicist who promoted sporting events in New York City for 60 years, including basketball at Madison Square Garden, the New York City Marathon and a trotter with an affinity for artichokes.

Goldstein was born in Conway, South Carolina where his father owned a business, and moved to Manhattan as a child with his family. He graduated from New York University.

Goldstein's public relations prowess relied on his ability to connect with reporters to create stories for his clients, which included promoting basketball for Madison Square Garden during the 1950s and for Roosevelt Raceway from the mid-1950s until 1969.

In 1959, a trotter from France named Jamin was scheduled to run in the inaugural International Trot at Roosevelt Raceway. Goldstein spread the word that the horse's chances were affected by the loss of over 150 pounds of artichokes that had been impounded, and then misplaced, by the United States Department of Agriculture at Idlewild Airport. Goldstein placed ads in The New York Times and New York Herald Tribune that read "French Trotter Needs Artichokes. Can You Help?", including a phone number of Roosevelt Raceway. Newspapers gave the story extensive play, with locals bring their backyard-grown artichokes to the track and United Airlines flying artichokes in from Watsonville, California, the artichoke capital of America. The horse was energized after eating the artichokes, or so Goldstein said, and went on to win the race in front of a crowd of 45,000.

At the 1962 International Trot, a French horse named Kracovie that had won that year's European circuit was missing a stablemate, either a mountain sheep or a goat, that could not be brought into the United States due to quarantine regulations, and would not eat in the absence of its companion. As described by George Vecsey in the Times, "The entertainer Tina Louise just happened to have a goat in her Manhattan apartment. Wearing a low-cut dress, she and her agent and the goat paid a mission of mercy to Roosevelt." Despite the publicity, and the goat, Kracovie lost the race to Su Mac Lad.

In 1969, Goldstein was hired as national press representative for the United States Trotting Association.

Goldstein died at age 81 on February 13, 2009, in Boca Raton, Florida due to a myocardial infarction and stroke. He was survived by three sons and two sisters. His wife, Helene, had died in 1999.
