= Maple Leaf Trot =

- Class: Grade 1
- Location: Campbellville, Ontario
- Inaugurated: 1950
- Race type: Harness race for Standardbred pacers
- Website: Woodbine Entertainment Group

Race information
- Distance: 1 mile (1,609 metres or 8 furlongs)
- Surface: Dirt, ⅞ mile oval
- Track: Mohawk Racetrack
- Qualification: 3-years-old & up
- Purse: $630,000 (2025)

The Maple Leaf Trot is a Grade 1 harness race for Standardbred trotters three years of age and older. It is run at a distance of one mile at Mohawk Racetrack in Campbellville, Ontario.

== Locations ==
- Thorncliffe Park Raceway : (1950-1953)
- Old Woodbine / Greenwood Raceway : (1954-1993)
- Woodbine Racetrack : (1994-2001)
- Mohawk Racetrack : (2002–present)

First run as the Maple Leaf Cup Trot on August 3, 1950 at Thorncliffe Park. In 1954 Standardbred the race was moved to the Old Woodbine track. Renamed the Greenwood Raceway in 1963, the race remained there until the track closed in 1993. From 1994 through 2001 Woodbine Racetrack was home to the Maple Leaf Trot after which it shifted to its present location at Mohawk Raceway.

== Historical notes ==
The 1950 inaugural running resulted in a tie after two races were run in which Morris Mite and Adeline Hanover each ran 1-2. With no third race runoff, a coin toss was agreed to by the owners which resulted in Morris Mite receiving the winner's trophy.

Four horses have won the Maple Leaf Trot three times. Tie Silk and No Sex Please won three during a four-year timespan, however Grandpa Jim and San Pail are the only horses to win three straight editions. For Grandpa Jim's three wins from 1969 through 1971, he earned a total of $147,600 while for San Pail's three wins from 2009 through 2011, he earned a total of $2,222,500.

In 2025, Lexus Kody won the race in 1:49 1/5, the fastest trotting mile in Canadian history. He broke the record of Aetos Kronos S, who had become Canada's first sub-1:50 trotter a week earlier when he won an elimination for the event in 1:49 4/5.

== Records ==
Most wins by a horse

- 3 – Tie Silk (1961, 1963, 1964)
- 3 – Grandpa Jim (1969, 1970, 1971)
- 3 – No Sex Please (1989, 1990, 1992)
- 3 – San Pail (2009, 2010, 2011)

Most wins by a driver

- 4 – Ron Waples (1984, 1989, 1990, 1992)

Most wins by a trainer

- 3 – Harold A. McKinley (1957, 1959, 1960), Howard Beissinger (1961, 1972, 1980), Robert G. Farrington (1969, 1970, 1971), Ron Waples, Jr. (1989, 1990, 1992), Rodney Hughes (2009, 2010, 2011), Ake Svanstedt (2016, 2022, 2023), Ron Burke (2017, 2020, 2025)

Most wins by an owner

- 4 – Miron Farms (Adrien & Gerard Miron) (1961, 1962, 1963, 1964)

Stakes record at 1 mile

- 1:49 1/5 – Lexus Kody (2025)

== Winners of the Maple Leaf Trot ==
Year	Winner	Age	Driver	Trainer	Owner	Dist.	Time	Purse
2025	Lexus Kody	7	Yannick Gingras	Ron Burke	Burke Racing Stable, Weaver Bruscemi, Phil Collura	1 m	1:49 1/5	$630,000
2024	Periculum	5	Scott Zeron	Marcus Melander	Brixton Medical Inc., Holly Lane Stud East Ltd.	1 m	1:50 4/5	$600,000
2023	Alrajah One IT	7	Dexter Dunn	Ake Svanstedt	Scuderia My Horse Inc.	1 m	1:50 2/5	$530,000
2022	Back Of The Neck	5	Tim Tetrick	Ake Svanstedt	Order By Stable, Howard Taylor, Judith Taylor, Ake Svanstedt	1 m	1:51 0/0	$610,000
2021	Lindy The Great	7	James MacDonald	Julie Miller	Andy Miller Stable, John Schmucker, John Mehlenbacher, VIP Internet Stable	1 m	1:51 3/5	$546,000
2020	Atlanta	5	Yannick Gingras	Ron Burke	Crawford Farms Racing, Brad Grant, Howard Taylor	1 m	1:50 4/5	$560,000
2019	Guardian Angel AS	5	Tim Tetrick	Anette Lorentzon	Acl Stuteri Ab, Kjell Johanssen	1 m	1:50 4/5	$600,000
2018	Crazy Wow	6	Jody Jamieson	Marcus Melander	Our Horse Cents Stables, Stable 45, J & T Silva Stables LLC, Deo Volente Farms LLC	1 m	1:51 1/5	$651,000
2017	Hannelore Hanover	5	Yannick Gingras	Ron Burke	Burke Racing Stable, Weaver Bruscemi, Jerry and Theresa Silva Stables, Frank Baldachino	1 m	1:51 1/5	$593,000
2016	Resolve	6	Ake Svanstedt	Ake Svanstedt	Hans Enggren	1 m	1:51 4/5	$632,000
2015	Bee A Magician	5	Brian Sears	Richard "Nifty" Norman	Mel Hartman, Herb Liverman & David McDuffee	1 m	1:52 3/5	$680,000
2014	Intimidate	5	Sylvain Filion	Luc Blais	Determination Stable (Serge Godin) & Judith Farrow	1 m	1:54 2/5	$603,000
2013	Market Share	4	Tim Tetrick	Linda Toscano	Richard Gutnick, T L P Stables & William Augustine	1 m	1:51 1/5	$543,000
2012	Mister Herbie	4	Jody Jamieson	Jeffrey Gillis	Jeffrey Gillis, Gerald Stay, Mac Nichol	1 m	1:50 4/5	$750,000
2011	San Pail	7	Randy Waples	Rodney Hughes	Rodney Hughes, Glenn Van Camp	1 m	1:51 1/5	$730,000
2010	San Pail	6	Randy Waples	Rodney Hughes	Rodney Hughes, Glenn Van Camp	1 m	1:51 3/5	$772,000
2009	San Pail	5	Randy Waples	Rodney Hughes	Rodney Hughes, Glenn Van Camp	1 m	1:52 1/5	$720,500
2008	Arch Madness	4	Brian Sears	Trond Smedshammer	Marc D. Goldberg, Willow Pond LLC	1 m	1:52 0/0	$728,600
2007	Equinox Bi	6	Trevor Ritchie	Jan Nordin	Scuderia Gina Biasuzzi	1 m	1:53 4/5	$693,500
2006	Peaceful Way	5	Trevor Ritchie	Dave Tingley	Goin MYWay Stable/M. Katz/A. J. Libfeld/S. Goldband/D. Tingley/A. Stiller	1 m	1:53 3/5	$877,500
2005	Mr. Muscleman	5	Ronald Pierce	Mike Vanderkemp	Adam Victor & Son Stable	1 m	1:52 1/5	$918,500
2004	Mr. Muscleman	4	Ronald Pierce	Mike Vanderkemp	Adam Victor & Son Stable	1 m	1:53 2/5	$861,500
2003	Rotation	4	Trevor Ritchie	Harald Lunde	Norwegian Viking Stb., Erikssund Farm, Mats Sundin, H. Nilsson	1 m	1:53 2/5	$851,500
2002	Fools Goal	7	Jack Moiseyev	Jim Doherty	Bruce McElven & Ronald Allen	1 m	1:53 1/5	$851,000
2001	Plesac	4	Douglas S. Brown	John Butenschoen	Richard Balog	1 m	1:53 2/5	$838,500
2000	Magician	5	David Miller	Earl Cruise	William C. Augenstein	1 m	1:52 3/5	$582,500
1999	Goodtimes	8	Dave Wall	John Bax	Parkhill Stud Farm, Liberty North	1 m	1:53 2/5	$251,000
1998	Hanko Angus	4	Rick Zeron	Rick Zeron	Fermes Illusion, C. Charest, C. Tremblay, Jack Sawatzky	1 m	1:54 0/0	$315,500
1997	Supergrit	4	Mark Jordan	Mark Jordan	Dennis Doyle	1 m	1:55 0/0	$228,500
1996	Wesgate Crown	5	Catello Manzi	Robert MacKenzie	Paul & John Simmonds, Lee Tevis	1 m	1:54 0/0	$200,000
1995	Glorys Comet	4	John Holmes	George Peters	Brylin Stable	1 m	1:55 1/5	$200,000
1994	Earl	5	Roger Mayotte	Chris Christoforou, Sr.	Banjo Farms, Chris Christoforou, Sr., James Bullock	1 m	1:54 2/5	$100,000
1993	Program Speed	4	William Gale	William G. Robinson	Marvin Katz, Alexander J. Libfeld, Sam Goldband	1 m	1:56 4/5	$100,000
1992	No Sex Please	7	Ron Waples	Ron Waples, Jr.	Ron Waples, Jr.	1 m	1:57 0/0	$100,000
1991	H H Killington	5	Mario Baillargeon	Rick Quesnel	Rick Quesnel	1 m	1:57 4/5	$100,000
1990	No Sex Please	5	Ron Waples	Ron Waples, Jr.	Ron Waples, Jr.	1 m	1:57 0/0	$175,950
1989	No Sex Please	4	Ron Waples	Ron Waples, Jr.	Ron Waples, Jr.	1 m	1:56 2/5	$144,960
1988	Natural Image	4	Steve Condren	Brad Maxwell	Sherry Chris, Don Broderick, Brad Maxwell	1 m	1:56 3/5	$125,400
1987	Franconia	6	John Campbell	Ron Gurfein	S. Gurfein, Estate of F. Mathes, H. Feingold, E. Axelrod	1 m	1:57 2/5	$115,260
1986	Grades Singing	4	Hervé Filion	Hervé Filion	Ferme Grade Inc.	1 m	1:57 2/5	$104,760
1985	Manfred Hanover	5	Patsy Rapone	Walt Szczepanski	Equinox Farms	1 m	1:58 1/5	$140,500
1984	Bridger	5	Ron Waples	Dave Green	Martin Starr & Lawrence Ball	1 m	1:57 2/5	$85,800
1983	Bridger	4	John Campbell	Dave Green	Martin Starr & Lawrence Ball	1 m	1:58 2/5	$85,800
1982	Bobbo	5	Norman C. Jones	Norman C. Jones	Greg Coleman	1 m	1:59 3/5	$136,500
1981	Super Marty	5	Herman Hylkema	Herman Hylkema	William R. Search	1 m	2:00 1/5	$102,500
1980	Lindy's Crown	4	Larry Walker	Howard Beissinger	Crown Stable	1 m	2:00 4/5	$104,000
1979	Cold Comfort	5	Billy Haughton	Billy Haughton	H.P.H. Stable	1 m	1:59 3/5	$100,000
1978	Cold Comfort	4	Peter Haughton	Billy Haughton	H.P.H. Stable	1 m	2:01 1/5	$90,000
1977	Ima Lula	4	Joe O'Brien	Joe O'Brien	Duncan A. MacDonald	1 m	1:59 2/5	$40,000
1976	Savoir	8	Ben Steall	Al Thomas	Allwood Stables (Leonard J. & Helen R. Buck)	1 m	2:04 1/5	$27,160
1975-1	Savoir	7	John Chapman	John Chapman	Allwood Stables (Leonard J. & Helen R. Buck)	1 m	2:01 4/5	$47,450
1975-2	Delmonica Hanover	5	John Chapman	Harold R. Dancer	Anne Ryan & Dorothy Hardy	1 m	2:02 2/5	$47,450
1974	Colonial Charm	4	Jack Bailey	Glen Garnsey	Castleton Farm	1 m	2:01 1/5	$64,600
1973	Flower Child	6	Joe O'Brien	Joe O'Brien	Sam Huttenbauer, Jr.	1 m	2:00 2/5	$62,800
1972	Speedy Crown	4	Howard Beissinger	Howard Beissinger	Speedy Crown Stable	1 m	2:00 3/5	$60,400
1971	Grandpa Jim	9	Richard L. Farrington	Robert G. Farrington	Trainor Acres	1 m	2:01 2/5	$57,100
1970	Grandpa Jim	8	Robert G. Farrington	Robert G. Farrington	Mrs. Marie Trainor	1 m	2:00 4/5	$49,500
1969	Grandpa Jim	7	Robert G. Farrington	Robert G. Farrington	Trainor Acres	1 m	2:01 3/5	$41,000
1968	Earl Laird	8	James H. Cruise, Sr.	James H. Cruise, Sr.	Joan Cruise	1 m	2:02 0/0	$32,800
1967	Critic's Choice	4	Ron Feagan	Frank Safford	Gray Brothers	1 m	2:02 2/5	$19,000
1966	Sprite Kid	8	Roger White	Roger White	Moe Israel & Eddie Woloz	1 m	2:02 0/0	$12,000
1965	Duke Rodney	7	Don Huff	Don Huff	Patrick & Elisabeth DiGennaro	1 3/16 m	2:29 4/5	$13,050
1964	Tie Silk	8	Marcel Dostie	Marcel Dostie	Miron Farms (Adrien & Gerard Miron)	1 3/16 m	2:31 1/5	$12,700
1963	Tie Silk	7	Frank Baise	Frank Baise	Miron Farms (Adrien & Gerard Miron)	1 1/8 m	2:28 0/0	$12,800
1962	Duke of Decatur	5	Keith Waples	Keith Waples	Miron Farms (Adrien & Gerard Miron)	1 m	2:04 0/0	$14,110
1961	Tie Silk	5	Howard Beissinger	Howard Beissinger	Miron Farms (Adrien & Gerard Miron)	1 m	2:07 3/5	$11,680
1960	Selka Song	7	Harold A. McKinley	Harold A. McKinley	Victoria & H. Charles Armstrong	1 m	2:07 2/5	$4,095
1959	Mr. Baldridge	5	Philippe Dussault	Philippe Dussault	Miron Farms (Adrien & Gerard Miron	1 m	2:03 4/5	$6,150
1958	Mr. Baldridge	4	Philippe Dussault	Philippe Dussault	Laurent Bourgon	1 m	2:02 1/5	$5,120
1957	In Free	3	Harold A. McKinley	Harold A. McKinley	J. Elgin & Charles E. Armstrong	1 m	2:07 2/5	$4,730
1956	No Race	-	No Race	No Race	No Race	-	0:00 0/0	00000
1955	No Race	-	No Race	No Race	No Race	-	0:00 0/0	00000
1954	Ben Boy	4	Keith Waples	Keith Waples	Mrs. Ruth Wray	1 m	2:10 0/0	$3,500
1953	Vanduzen	6	Jack H. Mehlenbacher	Jack H. Mehlenbacher	Jack H. Mehlenbacher	1 m	2:07 0/0	$2,500
1952	Celia's Counsel	4	William L. Rowe	W. Earl Rowe	Roweland Farms (W. Earl Rowe)	1 m	2:08 0/0	$3,000
1951	Projectile	8	Philippe Dussault	Philippe Dussault	Armand Plouffe	1 1/16 m	2:14 0/0	$3,000
1950-1	Morris Mite	8	Ephraim L'Heureux	Ephraim L'Heureux	Ovila Corbeil	1 1/16 m	2:08 2/5	$5,000
1950-2	Adeline Hanover	5	Harold F. Wellwood	Harold F. Wellwood	Theodore J. Zornow	1 1/16 m	2:13 2/5	$5,000
