= Lana Lobell Farms =

American horse-breeding enterprise

- Company type: Horse breeding farm
- Industry: Horse breeding
- Founded: 1960
- Founder: Alan J. Leavitt
- Defunct: 1989
- Headquarters: Bedminster, New Jersey; Hanover, Pennsylvania; Montgomery, New York
- Area served: United States
- Products: Standardbred racehorses
- Services: Horse breeding; yearling sales

Lana Lobell Farms was an American standardbred horse breeding farm operation that stretched across three states. It was founded by Alan J. Leavitt in Hanover, Pennsylvania, and became one of the leading standardbred breeding farms in the United States.

== History ==
The original Leavitt family farm property was owned by Boris Leavitt, the father of Lana L. Leavitt and Alan J. Leavitt. The Lana Lobell name came from his first business, a mail order company specializing in women's wear. Boris Leavitt created Lana Lobell, Inc. in 1934 and established eight retail stores within 100 miles of Hanover. By 1960, it operated a mail-order facility at 340 Poplar Street that served customers nationwide.

In its early years, a young Lana Leavitt represented Lobell Farms by participating in gaited saddle competitions at various horse shows, winning the Lancaster Lions Club Challenge Trophy in 1951, 1958, and 1960. Harvard graduate Alan Leavitt first became involved with standardbred horses in 1958. In September 1960, the Hanover show horse farm moved into standardbred breeding. The step came with the purchase of a controlling interest in Solicitor, a pacing stallion from Hanover Shoe Farms, for the 1961 stud season. Alan, who was a friend of the owner, bought the standardbred for $25,000.

=== Hanover, P.A. ===
Lobell Farms was first headquartered in Hanover, Pennsylvania. The farm was located about two miles south of Hanover along Grandview Road.

Alan leased the farm in the 1960s to breed and race standardbred racehorses. James "Jim" Harrison became the general manager of Lana Lobell Farms in Pennsylvania in the 1960s. It was one of the three largest standardbred breeding farms in the world by 1974. The Hanover farm had seven well-known stallions standing at stud in 1978, with breeding expert Jim Harrison overseeing the pairing of mares with the stallions. The roster included Adios Vic, Nansemond, Nero, Noble Victory, Entrepreneur, and Laverne Hanover. During the early 1980s, the stallions were relocated from York County, Pennsylvania, to facilities in New Jersey and New York, leaving the farm to operate exclusively as a yearling facility until sale. The 1,400-acre Hanover farm was the largest of the Lana Lobell locations.

=== Bedminster, N.J. ===
Lana Lobell extended its operations to New Jersey and later New York, where higher purses and a larger harness racing circuit attracted more buyers.

The land in New Jersey was purchased by Leavitt from descendants of Grant B. Schley, whose operation on the property had focused on commercial cattle. Leavitt acquired 200 acres of the 373-acre farm in March 1976 to establish a residence and horse farm. Lana Lobell Farms of New Jersey opened in 1977, and by 1982 the New Jersey branch had grown to 400 acres, with 180 in Bedminster and 220 in Readington Township. Operations were centered at the Bedminster farm, where Leavitt lived, while his business office was located in Whitehouse, New Jersey. Lana Lobell Farms appointed Hal Jones in 1978 to build and manage its New Jersey operation, placing him in charge of stallions including Oil Burner and Speedy Somolli. Oil Burner carried a $20,000 stud fee, once the highest for a stallion standing in New Jersey. A 1986 appraisal valued the farm and its equipment at $14,000,000. Lana Lobell Farms of New Jersey was then one of the top five breeding farms in the United States and the principal standardbred breeding operation in the state.

Four Hambletonian Stakes winners came from Lana Lobell Farms in Bedminster: Speedy Crown (1971), Steve Lobell (1976), Speedy Somoli (1978), and Mack Lobell (1987).

=== Montgomery, N.Y. ===
In November 1977, the horse-breeding venture added a third farm to its expanding operations, establishing a facility in the state of New York to provide Lana Lobell with three geographically distinct locations. Lana Lobell Farms of New York was spread over an 1,000-acre farm. The recording-setting sire Speedy Crown stood at Lana Lobell Farm in New York with a $50,000 service fee.

== Stallions ==
Lana Lobell Farm's Alan Leavitt would often form syndicate deals to collectively purchase harness race horses. The terms of the agreement granted Leavitt and Lana Lobell Farms exclusive breeding rights as commission.

- Overtrick: Syndicated for $450,000 in 1960.
- Noble Victory: Syndicated for $1 million in 1965–66.
- Rum Customer: Syndicated in December 1971.
- Speedy Crown: Syndicated for $1 million in 1972.
- Nansemond: Syndicated for $1.4 million.
- Nero: Syndicated for $3.6 million in 1976, the highest price ever paid for a standardbred.
- Oil Burner: Syndicated for $2.7 million in 1977, the third-highest price ever given for a harness horse at the time.
- Speedy Somolli: Syndicated for over $2 million in 1978. Lana Lobell had the rights to 41 breedings annually for the stallion.
- Joie de Vie
- No Nukes
- Mystic Park: Syndicated for $5.25 million in 1982.
- Temujin: Syndicated for $6.5 million in 1982.

Lana Lobell Farms offered stud services from its stable of stallions. In 1983, Lana Lobell Farms had 18 stallions, 15 of them syndicated, and roughly 340 broodmares that were entirely owned by the farm. The fee for breeding a broodmare to a Lana Lobell stallion ranged from $3,500 to $15,000, depending on the racing performance of the stallion's offspring. The farm maintained a "maternity barn," where foals stayed for three to four days after birth before being transferred elsewhere. All foals from Lana Lobell-owned mares carried "Lobell" in their names. Buyers had the option to rename their horses before they competed in their first race.

=== Broodmares ===
- Tarport Hap: Purchased for $325,000 in 1975 in conjunction with Wilrose Farms. (owned by William Rosenberg)

== Yearling Sale ==
The Lana Lobell Yearling Sale became known as one of New Jersey's top standardbred horse sales. The sales were held in Harrisburg, Pennsylvania and Timonium, Maryland, prior to 1970, when the sale of prized yearlings was held at Liberty Bell Park. Its reputation attracted high-profile buyers from around the world. The annual Harness Breeders Sales, taking place in mid-summer, was the farm's busiest time of year. By December 1983, the farm sold between 125 and 150 yearlings each summer for an average price of $58,911.

== Closure ==
Court filings indicated that Lana Lobell Farms had been in serious financial trouble since early 1987, owing more than $23 million. Despite its financial burdens, horses bred by the farm earned $4.6 million and ranked fourth in the United States for total harness racing purses in 1988. The New Jersey farm filed for bankruptcy on March 28, 1989, and was soon joined by its sister corporations in New York and Pennsylvania.
