= Peter Haughton =

US harness racer

Personal information
- Born: September 22, 1954 Amityville, New York, U.S.
- Died: January 25, 1980 (aged 25) East Rutherford, New Jersey, U.S.
- Occupation: Harness racing driver

Horse racing career
- Sport: Horse racing
- Career wins: 571

Major racing wins
- Prix d'Été (1974); Dexter Cup (1977); Dr. Harry M. Zweig Memorial (1977); Maple Leaf Trot (1978); International Trot (1978, 1979) U.S. Trotting Triple Crown wins: Kentucky Futurity (1976, 1978)

Honours
- United States Harness Racing Hall of Fame; Peter Haughton Memorial

Significant horses
- Armbro Omaha, Quick Pay, Cold Comfort, Doublemint

Peter Delvin Haughton (September 22, 1954 – January 25, 1980) was an American harness driver. He was the son of United States Harness Racing Hall of Fame inductee Billy Haughton.

== Racing career ==
Haughton made his first competitive drive at 16. He won the race driving Dr. Dewars. In the eight-year career that followed, Peter won a total of 571 races and more than $6 million in purses. In 1974 he won Prix d'Été on Blue Bonnets Raceway with Armbro Omaha. He was especially successful in big stake races, taking the Roosevelt International Trot twice, with Cold Comfort in 1978 and with Doublemint in 1979.

Haughton also won the Dexter Cup and the Zweig Memorial with Cold Comfort. In the 1976 Kentucky Futurity, Peter spoiled his father Bill's Triple Crown bid with Steve Lobell by nosing him out in the fourth heat with Quick Pay.

== Death ==
Peter Haughton died in an automobile accident in East Rutherford, New Jersey on January 25, 1980. He was inducted in the United States Harness Racing Hall of Fame in 1981. Since 1981, the race Peter Haughton Memorial is run at the Meadowlands Racetrack.

== Major racing wins ==
Year	Race	Horse	Trainer
1974	(Canada) Prix d'Été	Armbro Omaha	Billy Haughton
1976	(United States) Kentucky Futurity	Quick Pay	Billy Haughton
1977	(United States) Dexter Cup	Cold Comfort	Billy Haughton
1977	(United States) Dr. Harry M. Zweig Memorial	Cold Comfort	Billy Haughton
1978	(United States) Kentucky Futurity	Doublemint	Billy Haughton
1978	(Canada) Maple Leaf Trot	Cold Comfort	Billy Haughton
1978	(United States) International Trot	Cold Comfort	Billy Haughton
1979	(United States) International Trot	Doublemint	Billy Haughton
