= Catello Manzi =

American harness racing driver and trainer

Personal information
- Born: June 27, 1950 (age 76) Monticello, New York, U.S.
- Occupations: Harness racing driver, trainer

Horse racing career
- Sport: Horse racing
- Career wins: 14,812

Major racing wins
- Lawrence B. Sheppard Pace (1983); Hambletonian Oaks (1993); U.S. Pacing Championship (1994, 1997); Kentucky Filly Futurity (1995); Maple Leaf Trot (1996); William R. Haughton Memorial Pace (1998, 2005); Woodrow Wilson Pace (2000); Dexter Cup (2003); North America Cup (2004); Meadowlands Pace (2006) U.S. Pacing Triple Crown wins: Cane Pace (1996) U.S. Trotting Triple Crown wins: Yonkers Trot (1994, 2003, 2007)

Racing awards
- Harness Tracks of America Driver of the Year (2005)

Honours
- United States Harness Racing & Hall of Fame (2002)

Significant horses
- Beat The Wheel, Mantacular, Riyadh, Sugar Trader, Winky's Goal Runner
- Updated on October 23, 2016

Catello R. Manzi (born June 27, 1950) is an American harness racing driver and trainer. Manzi's nickname is 'Catman'.

Born in Monticello, New York, Manzi grew up in Sullivan County, New York, in a harness-racing family. His father Alfonso was a horse trainer. He drove his first race at Monticello Raceway in the late 1960s. Manzi's first career win came at Pocono Downs in 1969.

In 1974 Manzi set a Monticello Raceway record for most wins by a driver.

The 1994 Yonkers Trot winner, Bullsville Victory, was driven by Manzi. Manzi also drove Sugar Trader to victory in the 2003 Yonkers Trot. The Yonkers Trot is the second leg of the Triple Crown of Harness Racing for Trotters.

On May 27, 1999, Manzi suffered serious injuries in a spill at Freehold Raceway.

Manzi was inducted into the Harness Racing Hall of Fame in July 2002.

On December 31, 2005 at the age of 55, Manzi became the oldest harness driver to lead North America in victories.

For two decades Manzi would drive afternoon races at Freehold Raceway, go home to eat dinner, then drive more races in the evening at Meadowlands Racetrack.

Manzi drove his 14,000th career winner on December 14, 2010 at Yonkers Raceway. At the time, Hervé Filion and Dave Palone were the only other harness horse drivers to have 14,000 or more career winners.

On March 28, 2014, Manzi announced his retirement from driving following two bad accidents. The first, on September 6, 2013 at Freehold Raceway, left Manzi with a fractured pelvis. After recovering, he returned to racing only to be injured again when the starting car at Freehold Raceway lost control and collided with several drivers and horses on January 10, 2014. At the time of his retirement, Manzi was ranked third all-time for wins at 14,812, and fifth all-time in earnings at $158.5 million.
