= Howard Beissinger =

American harness racing driver (1923–2018)

Personal information
- Nickname: Hambo Howard
- Born: Howard F. Beissinger; May 16, 1923 Butler County, Ohio, U.S.
- Died: February 6, 2018 (aged 94) Hamilton, Ohio, U.S.
- Occupation: Harness racing driver
- Years active: 1946-1991

Horse racing career
- Sport: Harness racing
- Career winnings: $11,681,621
- Career wins: 1,710

Major racing wins
- Maple Leaf Trot (1961, 1972, 1980); Yonkers Trot (1969, 1978, 1983); Kentucky Futurity (1969); Hambletonian Stakes (1969, 1971, 1978); Dexter Cup (1969); Colonial Trot (1969); International Trot (1972); Hambletonian Oaks (1982); Breeders Crown (1987)

Honors
- United States Harness Racing Hall of Fame (1975)

Significant horses
- Lindy's Pride; Speedy Crown; Speedy Somolli

Howard Beissinger (May 16, 1923 – February 6, 2018) was an American harness racing driver and horse trainer who was a three-time Hambletonian Stakes winner.

== Early life ==
Howard F. Beissinger was born on May 16, 1923, in Butler County, Ohio, near Hamilton, in the United States.

== Career ==
In the years after World War II, he made horse racing his profession, quickly establishing himself on the Chicago circuit. He captured four Chicago driving championships from 1950 to 1955 and finished fourth nationally in 1954 with 103 wins.

In the mid-1960s, Beissinger partnered with the Antonacci family of New York to develop and race stakes winners. He divided his time in 1968 between Florida training duties and driving his stable at Hollywood Park Racetrack in California.

In 1969, Beissinger guided Lindy's Pride to wins in trotting's Big Five: the Yonkers Trot, Kentucky Futurity, Hambletonian Stakes, Dexter Cup, and the Colonial Trot, with the first three securing the Trotting Triple Crown.

He was the driver of Speedy Crown in his win at the 1971 Hambletonian Stakes. He also guided his son, Speedy Somolli, to victory in the 1978 Hambletonian Stakes. After winning three times, he earned himself the nickname "Hambo Howard".

At 64, Beissinger drove Defiant One to victory in the 1987 Breeders Crown in Toronto, Ontario, becoming the oldest winner in the event's history.

== Death ==
Beissinger died on February 6, 2018, at 94.

== Legacy ==
- USHWA Clem McCarthy Good Guy Award (1971)
- U.S. Harness Racing Hall of Fame (1974)
- Ohio Harness Racing Hall of Fame (1977)
- Butler County Sports Hall of Fame (1982)
- Little Brown Jug Wall of Fame (2004)
