= Mack Lobell =

American Standardbred racehorse

- Breed: Standardbred
- Sire: Mystic Park
- Grandsire: Noble Gesture
- Dam: Matina Hanover
- Damsire: Speedy Count
- Sex: Stallion
- Foaled: 1984
- Died: February 2016
- Country: United States
- Colour: brown
- Breeder: Lana Lobell Farms (US)
- Owner: Louis P. Guida
- Trainer: Charles Sylvester
- Record: 56:39-5-6 in North America; 38:32-5-0 in Europe
- Earnings: US$3,917,504

Major wins
- Breeders Crown 2yo (1986); Yonkers Trot (1987); Beacon Course Trot (1987); Hambletonian Stakes (1987); Breeders Crown 3yo (1987); International Trot (1988); Elitloppet (1988, 1989); Nat Ray Trot (1988); Breeders Crown (1988); Hugo Abergs Memorial (1989); Challenge Cup (1988, 1989)

Awards
- United States 2-Year Old Trotter of the Year (1986); United States 3-Year Old Trotter of the Year, United States Trotter of the Year & United States Harness Horse of the Year (1987); Aged Trotter of the Year & United States Harness Horse of the Year (1988); Swedish Harness Horse of the Year (1989)

Honours
- United States Harness Racing Hall of Fame
- Last updated on 2016-01-10

Mack Lobell (1984–2016) was a brown racing trotter by Mystic Park out of Matina Hanover by Speedy Count.

He won $3,917,594 during his career and was elected Harness Horse of the Year in 1987 and 1988. Among his many stakes victories were the Yonkers Trot, the Hambletonian, the Elitloppet (twice), the Breeders Crown events for three-year-old and for four-year-old trotters, and the International Trot. His best time of 1:52.1 for the mile was taken as a three-year-old in a race in Springfield, Illinois; this time set the world record for trotters. John Campbell described him as the best horse he has driven.

== 1986 season ==
In 1986 Mack Lobell won the Breeders Crown, set world records at Delaware and Lexington and finished second in the Peter Haughton Memorial. He was voted 2-Year Old Trotter of the Year.

== 1987 season ==
Before the 1987 Hambletonian Mack Lobell had run a world 2yo record for trotters in 1986, and had begun 1987 by winning the Yonkers Trot in equal world record time for his age on a half mile track and setting a Meadowlands track record by winning the Beacon Course Trot. In the Hambletonian Mack Lobell broke the stakes record in both heats winning in 1.54 and 1.53 3/5 beating the other heat winner Napoletano by 6 1/4 lengths despite foot soreness.

After his wins in the Yonkers Trot and The Hambletonian Mack Lobell had the chance to win the Triple Crown by winning the Kentucky Futurity. However, after he broke stride in both heats of the World Trotting Derby at Du Quoin won by Napoletano the task looked more difficult. In the Kentucky Futurity at Lexington Mack Lobell and Napoletano each won a division of the first heat. In the second heat Mack Lobell was defeated by Napoletano after setting a slow pace therefore failing to become the first trotter since 1972 to win the Triple Crown. Toward the end of the season Mack Lobell won the Breeders Crown at Pompano Park by 12 3/4 lengths from Napoletano in a time of 1.54 4/5 shattering the previous world record for a 5/8 mile track of 1.57. He also won the Colonial Trot in addition to his Beacon Course, Yonkers Trot, Hambletonian and Breeders Crown wins and world record mile at Springfield and was named Harness Horse of the Year for 1988 with 13 wins from 16 starts and $1.2m in earnings.

== 1988 season ==
Mack Lobell won the Elitloppet in Sweden early in 1988 beating another American trotter Sugarcane Hanover. In his Elitlopp win he trotted the fastest mile outside North America. Returning to the United States he won a leg of the Statue Of Liberty series, the Nat Ray Trot, the Breeders Crown, International Trot, Challenge Cup and Van Lennep Memorial. In the International Trot he beat opponents from six countries and set a Yonkers track record for the 1 1/4 mile distance in becoming the first American winner of the race since 1980. In a leg of the Statue of Liberty Series at The Meadowlands he broke the world record for 1 1/8 miles. Late in 1988 he finished third behind Sugarcane Hanover and French trotter Ourasi in the March Of Dimes Trot at Garden State Park in a field that also included Napoletano and European trotter Callit and Canada's No Sex Please. His 17 wins from 19 starts were sufficient for him to be named Harness Horse of the Year

Early on, Mack Lobell was managed by Chuck Sylvester, and almost always had John Campbell as his driver, but after his performances in Europe at the age of four he was sold to Swedish trainer and breeder John-Eric Magnusson for a reported $6m. In Sweden Mack Lobell continued his successful career, although the primary intention behind bringing the horse to Sweden was for breeding purposes. While racing in Europe he won races in Sweden, Italy, Germany, Denmark, Norway and Finland.

== 1989 & 1990 seasons ==
In 1989 Mack Lobell raced mainly in Europe with wins in the Hugo Abergs Memorial in Sweden, the Campionato Europeo in Italy, the GP von Bild in Germany and the Momarken Grand Prix in Norway. He was also mixing racing with breeding duties He returned to the United States for the International trot but was only third to Kit Lobell. After the International Trot John Campbell was replaced as driver and Mack Lobell won the Challenge Cup for a second time.

In 1990 he won the Elitloppet for a second time. He also won the St Michel Ajo in Finland, the Kosters Memorial in Denmark and a second GP von Bild in Germany.

Mack Lobell didn't come close to duplicating his racing success at stud. Mack Lobell died in Sweden in 2016.
