= Speedy Crown =

American-bred Standardbred racehorse

- Breed: Standardbred
- Sire: Speedy Scot
- Grandsire: Speedster
- Dam: Missile Toe
- Damsire: Florican
- Sex: Stallion
- Foaled: 1968
- Died: May 4, 2000
- Country: United States
- Colour: Bay
- Breeder: Ann Beissinger
- Owner: Crown Stable Inc.
- Trainer: Howard Beissinger
- Record: 1:57.1
- Earnings: $545,495

Major wins
- Hambletonian Stakes (1971)

Awards
- Trotter of the Year (1971); Three-Year-Old Trotter of the Year (1971); Four-Year-Old Trotter of the Year (1972)

Honours
- United States Harness Racing Hall of Fame (1996)

Speedy Crown (1968 – May 4, 2000) was an American standardbred racehorse who won the 1971 Hambletonian Stakes. He was inducted into the United States Harness Racing Hall of Fame in 1996.

== Origin and early years ==
Speedy Crown's breeder was Ann Beissinger, who bred the horse at the family's farm in Hamilton, Ohio. Foaled in 1968, he was sired by Speedy Scot out of Missile Toe (by Florican). His sire was the winner of the 1963 Hambletonian.

In March 1970, Crown Stable, Inc., owned by Thomas and Frank L. Antonacci of Plainview, New York, purchased the two-year-old Speedy Crown. The Antonacci brothers retained Howard Beissinger as trainer-driver.

== Racing career ==
=== Three-year-old season ===
==== Hambletonian Stakes ====
The Ohio-bred colt was crowned the 1971 champion of the 3-year-old trotters following a victory in the 46th Hambletonian Stakes at DuQuoin State Fairgrounds Racetrack. With heats of 1:57 2/5 and 1:58 1/5, he defeated Savoir, the 1:57 2/5 becoming the second-fastest one-mile heat ever recorded at the Hambletonian. The $64,885 purse from the Hambletonian pushed his career earnings to nearly $100,000. The Hambletonian win by Speedy Crown came eight years after his sire, Speedy Scot, and seven years before his son, Speedy Somolli.

==== Old Oaken Bucket ====
On September 22, 1971, he captured Delaware's Old Oaken Bucket trophy for three-year-old trotters in three heats. The second heat of 1:59 2/5 established a world record for age and gait on a double oval. His total time of 6:03 4/5 also set world records for three-year-old trotters on a double oval and for all ages.

Speedy Crown, ineligible for the Kentucky Futurity, was set for a solo time trial at the Grand Circuit meeting at The Red Mile in Lexington from September 28 to October 9, 1972. The trial was an attempt to break the 1:56 3/5 world record for three-year-old trotters. He went on to record a 1:57.1 mile.

=== Four-year-old season ===
Among his 1972 races was an $11,000 Challenge Stakes at Scioto Downs near Columbus on June 8, 1972. He won by 17¾ lengths and tied Nevele Pride's world record by trotting the mile in 1:58. He was entered in the $92,505.02 Realization Trot for four-year-olds at Roosevelt Raceway on June 24, 1972, which he won for $46,252.

==== International Trot ====
At Roosevelt Raceway on July 15, 1972, he competed in the $125,000 International Trot. With the defending French champion scratched by the state commission, he faced Canada's Fresh Yankee. He won the race and collected $62,500 as the new world trotting champion. He was the first American horse to win the International Trot since 1964. Days later, he beat France's Une de Mai and Fresh Yankee in a $150,000 invitational race at Roosevelt Raceway on July 22, 1972, before a crowd of 31,633. At the time, the special race had the largest gross purse for an invitational in standardbred history, with the winner earning $100,000.

Speedy Crown then competed in a series of stakes races in Canada. On August 12, 1972, he captured the Maple Leaf Trot at Greenwood Raceway, establishing a new Greenwood track and stakes record. He won the Montreal Trot on August 18, 1972, at Blue Bonnets Raceway in Montreal, Quebec.

== Stud record ==
At age four, Speedy Crown became the first standardbred to be syndicated for a million dollars when a group led by Alan Leavitt purchased him in 1971. After purchasing Speedy Crown from Crown Stables Inc., the 10-man syndicate allowed the trotter to continue racing through the 1972 season. In 1973, he was retired to stud at Lana Lobell Farms. Speedy Crown's stud fee was $50,000, the second highest after Albatross. In 1977, the 15-year-old stallion was bred to 240 mares via artificial insemination. Among his offspring were three Hambletonian winners: Speedy Somolli (1978), Prakas (1985), and Armbro Goal (1988).

His breeding career produced over 2,200 foals, ending with his retirement in 1996.

== Death ==
Speedy Crown died on May 4, 2000, at age 32. His final resting place is in the infield at Historic Track in Goshen, New York.

== Legacy ==
The United States Harness Writers Association named him Trotter of the Year and Three-Year-Old Trotter of the Year in 1971, followed by Four-Year-Old Trotter of the Year honors in 1972.

Speedy Crown was inducted into the United States Harness Racing Hall of Fame in 1996.

== See also ==
- List of racehorses
