= Yonkers Trot =

- Location: Yonkers, New York
- Inaugurated: 1955
- Race type: Harness race for standardbred trotters
- Website: Empire City Casino Racing

Race information
- Distance: 1 mile (1,609 metres or 8 furlongs)
- Surface: Dirt, 1/2 mile oval
- Track: Yonkers Raceway
- Qualification: 3-year-olds
- Purse: $500,000 (2025)

The Yonkers Trot is a harness racing event for three-year-old Standardbred trotters raced at a distance of one mile at Yonkers Raceway in Yonkers, New York. The race was created in 1955 to join the Hambletonian and the Kentucky Futurity to form the new United States Trotting Triple Crown.

== Historical race events ==
Driven by Joe O'Brien, California runner Scott Frost followed up his victory in the Hambletonian Stakes with a win in the 1955 Yonkers Trot inaugural. The colt went on to win the Kentucky Futurity to become the first winner of the Trotting Triple Crown.

In 1967, eight of the thirteen Yonkers Trot runners broke stride helping Harry Pownall drive longshot Pomp to victory.

Reminiscent of the day when Ron Turcotte aboard the legendary Thoroughbred Secretariat obliterated the Belmont Park track record by 2 3/5 seconds in winning the 1973 Belmont Stakes, in 1977 Billy Haughton drove Green Speed to a new Yonkers Trot record by the same 2 3/5 seconds margin.

The 2000 Yonkers Trot saw Jacqueline Ingrassia become the first female driver to ever win a leg of a harness racing Triple Crown event when she guided Goalfish to victory.

In 2016, Paula Wellwood became the first female trainer to win not only the Yonkers Trot but the U.S. Trotting Triple Crown with Marion Marauder.

Due to renovations at Yonkers Raceway, the race was hosted by Hawthorne Race Course in Chicago. It was won by Windsong's Legacy who posted the fastest mile in the 34 years that harness racing had been run at the Hawthorne track.

== Race locations ==
- 1955–2003, & 2006–present: Yonkers Raceway, Yonkers, New York
- 2004: Hawthorne Race Course (Chicago, Illinois)
- 2005: Freehold Raceway (Freehold Borough, New Jersey)

== Race distances ==
From inception in 1955 through 1962, the Yonkers Trot was raced over a distance of 1 1/16 miles (1710 metres).

== Records ==
Most wins by a driver

- 6 – Stanley Dancer (1959, 1965, 1968, 1971, 1972, 1975)

Most wins by a trainer

- 6 – Stanley Dancer (1959, 1965, 1968, 1971, 1972, 1975)

Stakes record (1 mile)

- 1:53 1/5 – Windsong's Legacy (2005, at Hawthorne), Joviality S (2022, at Yonkers)

Stakes record (1 1/16 miles)

- 2:10 3/5 – Duke Rodney (1961 at Yonkers)

== Yonkers Trot winners ==
Year	Winner	Driver	Trainer	Owner	Time	Purse
2025	Super Chapter	Dexter Dunn	Marcus Melander	Jeffrey Snyder and Arthur Pronti	1:54 3/5	$300,000
2024	Sir Pinocchio	Jason Bartlett	Ed Hart	Carolyn Atherton	1:54 4/5	$300,000
2023	Up Your Deo	Ake Svanstedt	Ake Svanstedt	Ake Svanstedt, Suleyman Yuksel Stables Inc., Van Camp Trotting Corp.	1:53 3/5	$300,000
2022	Joviality S	Brian Sears	Marcus Melander	Courant Inc	1:53 1/5	$280,904
2021	Johan Palema	Yannick Gingras	Ake Svanstedt	Bender Sweden Inc	1:55 0/0	$500,000
2020	No Race	No Race	No Race	No Race	0:00 0/0	$000,000
2019	Gimpanzee	Brian Sears	Marcus Melander	Courant Inc. & SRF Stable	1:53 3/5	$500,000
2018	Six Pack	Ake Svanstedt	Ake Svanstedt	Svanstedt, Little E, Stall Kalmar & Lars Berg.	1:54 0/0	$500,000
2017	Top Flight Angel	Brian Sears	Julie Miller	Legendary Standardbred Farm	1:56 3/5	$500,000
2016	Marion Marauder	Scott Zeron	Paula Wellwood	Jean Wellwood, Devin Keeler	1:56 1/5	$500,000
2015	Habitat	Brian Sears	Ron Burke	Burke Racing Stable, Our Horse Cents Stables, Weaver Bruscemi	1:54 4/5	$500,000
2014	Nuncio	John Campbell	Jimmy Takter	Stall TZ Inc. (Stefan Melander)	1:56 0/0	$500,000
2013	Dewycolorintheline	Ray Schnittker	Ray Schnittker	Schnittker, Iannazzo, Gewertz, Baldassare & Deweycheatumnhowe Stb.	1:57 3/5	$450,000
2012	Archangel	Jim Morrill, Jr.	Peter Arrigenna	P. Arrigenna, Alan Hainsworth, & Clare Semer	1:54 1/5	$445,594
2011	Leader Of The Gang	David Miller	Jimmy Takter	Christina Takter, Joyce McClelland, R A W Equine, Brixton Medical Ab	1:57 2/5	$445,474
2010	On The Tab	David Miller	Jimmy Takter	Christina Takter, John Fielding, Louie Camara, Falkbolagen AB	1:58 4/5	$573,770
2009	Judge Joe	Ronald Pierce	Jimmy Takter	Atlantic Trot, Inc. (Mario Zuanetti)	1:56 1/5	$670,774
2008	Napoleon	Stéphane Bouchard	Noel Daley	Larry Thomases, Sidney Korn, John Guarniere, Ken Tucci	1:57 1/5	$605,854
2007	Green Day	Catello Manzi	James D. Raymer	Trillium Racing Stable (James & Mary Raymer)	1:56 0/0	$644,770
2006	Glidemaster	George Brennan	Blair Burgess	Robert Burgess, Karin-Olsson Burgess, Marsha Cohen, Brittany Farms	1:55 4/5	$728,930
2005	Strong Yankee	Brian Sears	Trond Smedshammer	Strong Yankee Stable	1:56 1/5	$297,816
2004	Windsong's Legacy	Trond Smedshammer	Trond Smedshammer	Ann Brannvoll, Ted Gewertz, Patricia Spinelli	1:53 1/5	$391,200
2003	Sugar Trader	Catello Manzi	John Brennan	John Brennan, John Nordstrom, John Taddeo	1:58 3/5	$337,229
2002	Bubba Dunn	Jeff Gregory	Jeffrey Smith	Ira Kristel	1:58 4/5	$338,626
2001	Banker Hall	Trevor Ritchie	Harold Lunde	Tommy B. Andersson	1:59 1/5	$340,614
2000	Goalfish	Jacqueline Ingrassia	Frank Ingrassia	Jacqueline Ingrassia	1:59 0/0	$345,403
1999	CR Renegade	Rod Allen	Carl E. Allen	Carl & Rod Allen Stable	1:58 0/0	$273,891
1998	Muscles Yankee	John Campbell	Charles Sylvester	Perretti Farms Inc, Irving G. Liverman & David French	1:57 3/5	$319,725
1997	Lord Stormont	Douglas S. Brown	Norman C. Jones	Stormont Meadows (Eric Baker)	1:58 4/5	$291,948
1996	Continentalvictory	Michel Lachance	Ron Gurfein	Continentalvictory Stable (D. Frost/H. Gold/R. & J. Silva/Stix Inc./Allister Stb.)	1:56 2/5	$334,700
1995	CR Kay Suzie	Rod Allen	Carl E. Allen	Carl & Rod Allen Stable	1:56 0/0	$276,564
1994	Bullville Victory	Catello Manzi	Per Eriksson	Graham Mottram, Tom Artandi, Palmer, Per Eriksson	1:58 2/5	$286,280
1993	American Winner	Ronald Pierce	Milton Smith	Robert Key, & John Glesmann	1:56 2/5	$313,699
1992	Mc Cluckey (DH)	Michel Lachance	Joseph Holloway	Robert Suslow	1:58 2/5	$370,265
1992	Magic Lobell (DH)	Lorenzo Baldi	Terje Fossheim		1:58 2/5	
1991	Crown's Invitation	Michel Lachance	Jerry Riordan	Louis P. Guida	1:59 3/5	$370,393
1990	Royal Troubador	Carl E. Allen	Carl E. Allen	Carl & Rod Allen Stable	1:58 2/5	$424,965
1989	Valley Victory	Bill O'Donnell	Steve Elliott	Arlene Traub	1:58 3/5	$418,810
1988	Southern Newton	Berndt O. Lindstedt	Jan Johnson	Thor Christiansson	2:00 0/0	$431,495
1987	Mack Lobell	John Campbell	Charles Sylvester	One More Time Stable (L. P. Guida, et al. & Fair Winds Farm (E. Mullen))	1:57 4/5	$324,115
1986	Gunslinger Spur	Richard L. Stillings	Richard L. Stillings	Roy D. Davis	2:00 4/5	$372,503
1985	Master Willie	Jan Nordin	Sören Nordin	Dr. William & Ann Allen	1:59 3/5	$440,840
1984	Baltic Speed	Jan Nordin	Sören Nordin	Baltic Farm	2:01 3/5	$431,780
1983	Joie De Vie	William Gilmour	Howard Beissinger	Murray Siegel, Crown Stable, P. Nigito & Lana Lobell Farms	2:00 3/5	$486,150
1982	Mystic Park	Frank O'Mara	Frank O'Mara	Allen Wechter, Dr. Robert Lester, Gerald & Irving Wechter	2:00 3/5	$415,160
1981	Mo Bandy	Carl E. Allen	Carl E. Allen	Carl E. Allen	2:02 1/5	$284,701
1980	Nevele Impulse	Richard Macomber	Richard Macomber	Karl Hubbert	2:03 2/5	$261,040
1979	Chiola Hanover	James Allen	Bill Vaughn	Alnoff Stable (Michael, Bobby & Allan Chasanoff)	2:04 0/0	$237,765
1978	Speedy Somolli	Howard Beissinger	Howard Beissinger	Ann Beissinger, Barbara Mumma, Alan J. Leavitt, William Rosenberg	1:59 3/5	$233,594
1977	Green Speed	Billy Haughton	Billy Haughton	Mrs. Beverly Lloyds	1:59 0/0	$239,000
1976	Steve Lobell	Billy Haughton	Billy Haughton	Mill Island Stable (Richard Herman & Murray Siegel)	2:01 4/5	$202,004
1975	Surefire Hanover	Stanley Dancer	Stanley Dancer	Rachel L. Dancer & Rose Hild Breeding Farm.	2:03 0/0	$200,000
1974	Spitfire Hanover	Delvin Miller	Delvin Miller	Delvin Miller	2:05 2/5	$125,821
1973	Tamerlane	Charles W. Clark	Charles W. Clark	Bill & Madeline Shehan	2:04 4/5	$93,242
1972	Super Bowl	Stanley Dancer	Stanley Dancer	Rachel L. Dancer & Rose Hild Breeding Farm	2:02 0/0	$93,097
1971	Quick Pride	Stanley Dancer	Stanley Dancer	Stanley & Rachel Dancer/Raymond Gault/Blue Chip Farms/Hilda Silverstein	2:02 4/5	$110,795
1970	Victory Star	Vernon Dancer	Vernon Dancer	Fury Stable (Newman Pearsall)	2:03 4/5	$106,770
1969	Lindy's Pride	Howard Beissinger	Howard Beissinger	Lindy Farms, Inc.	2:03 0/0	$100,000
1968	Nevele Pride	Stanley Dancer	Stanley Dancer	Nevele Acres & Louis Resnick	2:03 3/5	$150,000
1967	Pomp	Harry Pownall	Harry Pownall	Arden Homestead Stable (E. Roland Harriman & Elbridge T. Gerry, Sr.)	2:04 4/5	$150,000
1966	Polaris	George Sholty	George Sholty	Livio Battista	2:06 0/0	$123,375
1965	Noble Victory	Stanley Dancer	Stanley Dancer	Kenneth D. Owen	2:02 0/0	$122,236
1964	Ayres	John F. Simpson, Sr.	John F. Simpson, Sr.	Charlotte Sheppard	2:01 3/5	$116,691
1963	Speedy Scot	Ralph N. Baldwin	Ralph N. Baldwin	Castleton Farm	2:03 3/5	$135,127
1962	A.C.'s Viking	Sanders Russels	Sanders Russels	Mr. & Mrs. Andrew C. Petersen	2:10 4/5	$105,422
1961	Duke Rodney	Edward T. Wheeler	Edward T. Wheeler	Patrick & Elisabeth DiGennaro	2:10 3/5	$100,330
1960	Duke of Decatur	Delvin Miller	Delvin Miller	Walter T. Candler	2:13 3/5	$74,265
1959	John A. Hanover	Stanley Dancer	Stanley Dancer	Dr. Nicholas & Angela Derrico	2:11 0/0	$56,397
1958	Spunky Hanover	Howard Camper	Robert Camper	Fiesta Farm (Harold Large)	2:13 3/5	$56,157
1957	Hoot Song	Ralph N. Baldwin	Ralph N. Baldwin	Two Gaits Farm (Leo C. McNamara)	2:16 1/5	$57,812
1956	Add Hanover	John F. Simpson Sr.	John F. Simpson, Sr.	A. C. Mudge	2:12 4/5	$77,170
1955	Scott Frost	Joe O'Brien	Joe O'Brien	S. A. Camp Farms	2:12 0/0	$73,840
