= Barbara Jo Rubin =

American jockey (born 1949)

Personal information
- Born: November 21, 1949 (age 76)

Horse racing career
- Sport: Horse racing
- Career wins: Charles Town (1969)

Barbara Jo Rubin (born November 21, 1949) is an American jockey. She was the first woman to win a professional horse race.

== Early life ==
Barbara Jo Rubin was born on November 21, 1949, in Highland.

== Licensing ==
Women had been riding racehorses in assorted races for decades, some openly, others disguised as men. Once licensure became required for riding in recognized parimutuel races, women were generally discouraged from applying or denied licensure, even in locations where women were not explicitly barred.

The "modern era of female jockeys" began when Olympic equestrian and show jumping competitor Kathy Kusner, who had also ridden as a jockey, successfully sued the Maryland Racing Commission for a jockey's license in 1967 under the Civil Rights Act. She won her case in 1968 and became one of the first women to be licensed in the United States, though an injury prevented her from racing at the time. In late 1968, Penny Ann Early was the first woman to earn a mount as a licensed Thoroughbred jockey in the U.S., but when she entered three races at Churchill Downs in November, the male jockeys announced a boycott of those races, and so she could not ride. On 7 February 1969, Diane Crump was the first licensed woman rider to ride in a parimutuel Thoroughbred race in the United States at Hialeah Park Race Track in Florida. She required a police escort to get to the paddock. Two weeks later, on 22 February at Charles Town in West Virginia, Barbara Jo Rubin became the first licensed woman to win a race in the modern era. She went on to win 11 of the next 22 races she rode.
