= Speedy Scot =

American-bred Standardbred racehorse

- Breed: Standardbred
- Sire: Speedster
- Grandsire: Rodney
- Dam: Scotch Love
- Damsire: Victory Song
- Sex: Stallion
- Foaled: 1960
- Died: 1990
- Country: United States
- Colour: Bay
- Breeder: Castleton Farm
- Owner: Frances Dodge & Frederick Van Lennep
- Trainer: Ralph N. Baldwin
- Record: 1:56.4
- Earnings: $650,909

Major wins
- Hambletonian Stakes (1963); International Trot (1963)

Awards
- Two-Year-Old Trotter of the Year (1962); American Harness Horse of the Year (1963)

Honours
- United States Harness Racing Hall of Fame (1994)

Speedy Scot (1960–1990) was an American standardbred racehorse who became the second horse to win the Trotting Triple Crown.

== Origin and early years ==
Speedy Scot was foaled in 1960 at Castleton Farm near Lexington, Kentucky, United States. His sire, Speedster, finished fifth in the 1957 Hambletonian, while his grandsire, Rodney, was second in the 1947 edition of the race. His dam was Scotch Love, and his damsire was Victory Song. The colt, by Speedster out of Scotch Love, was owned by Frances Dodge and Frederick Van Lennep of Castleton Farm and trained by Ralph N. Baldwin.

== Racing career ==
=== Two-year-old season ===
During the summer of 1962, Speedy Scot began his two-year-old campaign in Grand Circuit stakes. He won a featured trot at Upstate New York's Vernon Downs on June 26, 1962. On July 3, 1962, he won the $17,000 E. H. Harriman Challenge Trophy at Historic Track in Goshen, New York. He put together four consecutive wins before his first loss in a stake event at Monticello Raceway on July 12, 1962. Racing at Vernon Downs on July 16, 1962, the Castleton Farm trotter recorded his fifth win in six starts. He followed that performance by winning the Thomas W. Murphy Trophy on July 26, 1962.

The two-year-old son of Speedster set a new Greyhound Stake record of 2:01 4/5 in Springfield on August 16, 1962. On August 23, 1962, he won the $10,000 American National Stake for two-year-old trotters at Sportsman's Park Racetrack. The victory, achieved in 2:05 2/5, was his 11th in 12 starts that season. Speedy Scot set another record on August 29, 1962, during the Castleton Farm Stake at the DuQuoin State Fair, but lost the race to Arden Homestead's Floris.

On his first appearance in Chicago at Washington Park Race Track, he was victorious in the Fort Dearborn Trot on September 11, 1962. The third annual Westbury Futurity at Roosevelt Raceway was won by Speedy Scot on September 18, 1962. His winning time of 2:04 3/5 tied the existing track record held by Sprite Rodney and improved his seasonal record to 14 wins in 17 races.

At the end of the 1962 season, he won 14 of 19 starts, leading as the top money-winner in his class with $90,805. As a two-year-old, he trotted to a mark of 2:01.1.

=== Three-year-old season ===
Expectations were high for Speedy Scot as he prepared for his campaign as a three-year-old and a potential Hambletonian run. In January 1963, he topped the eligibility list of 75 horses named for the 88th Hambletonian Stakes.

The trotting champion of 1962 made his season debut in the Historic-Dickerson Cup at Goshen's Historic Track on July 3, 1963. During that month, he won the Thomas B. Gaines Memorial Trophy at Vernon Downs with a mile of 1:59 2/5. His first loss that season came on July 29, 1963, when he broke stride at the U.S. Harness Writers' Trot at Roosevelt Raceway. He came sixth to Cheer Honey driven by Frank Ervin.

On August 15, 1963, Speedy Scot won the $135,127.50 Yonkers Trot at Yonkers Raceway. The win secured the first leg of the Triple Crown of Trotting.

==== Hambletonian Stakes ====
Before competing in the Hambletonian, he had won all but one of his six starts that season. On August 28, 1963, Speedy Scot claimed the 1963 Hambletonian Stakes at the DuQuoin State Fairgrounds Racetrack before a record crowd of over 40,000 people. After Florlis recorded the fastest time ever recorded in the Hambletonian during the first heat, Speedy Scot won the next two, with times of 1:58 and 1:58 2/5 in the deciding heat. For all heats, he posted a total clocking of 5:54 to lower the all-age record for three heats combined, beating the 15-year-old record set by his grandsire, Rodney, in 1948. The Hambletonian victory added the second leg of the Trotting Triple Crown to his record.

On September 3, 1963, he finished first in the $39,549 Horseman Futurity at the Indiana State Fair after winning the first two heats. He set a record for the event with a mark of 1:59 1/5.

Speedy Scot trotted the fastest mile ever for a three-year-old at the Lexington Trotting Track on September 27, 1963. The time was 1:56 4/5, breaking the 1952 record. His driver, Ralph Baldwin, claimed it was 1:56 flat. On October 4, 1963, Speedy Scot won the 71st Kentucky Futurity at The Red Mile in straight heats. His first heat was clocked in 1:57.1, beating the previous Kentucky Futurity record of 1:58.1 by Kaleb. He took the second heat in 1:57.2, one length ahead of Florlis. With the victory, he became the second horse in harness racing history to win the Trotting Triple Crown, next to Scott Frost's 1955 run.

By winning the Dexter Cup at Roosevelt Raceway on November 8, 1963, the Triple Crown champion finished a sweep of trotting's Grand Slam which comprised the major three-year-old trotting events, including the Yonkers Trot and Kentucky Futurity. The win was his 13th in 15 appearances during the season with the race carrying a purse of $40,188.

Following his 1963 campaign, he became the first trotter to post seven sub-two-minute miles in a single season.

=== Four-year-old season ===
In his fourth year of racing, he won the $95,690.86 Realization Trot at Roosevelt Raceway on August 1, 1964. He earned the biggest payoff in harness racing history. This included $45,690.86 for winning the race and a $50,000 bonus for becoming the first winner of Roosevelt Raceway's Founder's Plate. To get the bonus, Speedy Scot had put together wins in Roosevelt Raceway's Westbury Futurity as a two-year-old, the Dexter Cup as a three-year-old, and the Realization Trot as a four-year-old.

He won the $50,000 American Trotting Championship in August 1964 with a world record of 2:31 2/5 for the mile and a quarter. The win placed him in the Roosevelt International lineup, where he faced prominent trotters from Europe. Representing the United States, he went on to win the 1964 International Trot at Roosevelt Raceway.

At the end of the 1964 season, he was the top money winner among four-year-olds and up with earnings of $235,710.

=== Five-year-old season ===
For the second consecutive year, the defending champion won the $50,000 American Trotting Championship at Roosevelt Raceway in June 1965. His success in the 20th American Trotting Championship secured him a berth as the United States entry in the $100,000 International Trot at Roosevelt Raceway on July 10, 1965.

In the 1965 season, he recorded a win in the Dream Trot by overcoming Ayres, who had won the Hambletonian the year before.

The retirement of Speedy Scot was announced in November 1965 by Frederick van Lennep of Castleton Farm, with plans for the horse to enter stud the following year at $2,500.

== Stud record ==
He was the sire of Speedy Crown.

== Death ==
Speedy Scot died on June 15, 1990, at 30 years old in his paddock at Castleton Farm in Lexington, Kentucky, United States.

== Legacy ==
In a nationwide poll of sports writers and sportscasters conducted by the United States Trotting Association, Speedy Scot was voted the Two-Year-Old Trotter of the Year in December 1962. He was named the best juvenile trotter by 45 of 101 voters. He was voted Three-Year-Old Trotter of the Year in 1963.

Speedy Scot was elected into the United States Harness Racing Hall of Fame in 1994.

== See also ==
- List of racehorses
