= John F. Simpson Sr. =

American harness racing driver (1923–2000)

Personal information
- Nickname: Johnny Simpson
- Born: John F. Simpson; 1919 Chester, South Carolina, U.S.
- Died: August 28, 1995 (aged 75–76) Orlando, Florida, U.S.
- Occupations: Harness racing driver; horse trainer

Horse racing career
- Sport: Harness racing
- Career winnings: $4,717,021
- Career wins: 1,467

Major racing wins
- Walnut Hall Cup (1951); Little Brown Jug (1956, 1957, 1960); Hambletonian Stakes (1957, 1964); Yonkers Trot (1956, 1964); Cane Pace (1956, 1957); Messenger Stakes (1962); Transylvania Trot (1969)

Honors
- United States Harness Racing Hall of Fame (1972); Little Brown Jug Wall of Fame (1988)

Significant horses
- Ayres

John F. Simpson Sr. (1919 – August 28, 1995), better known as Johnny Simpson, was an American harness racing driver and horse trainer who won the Hambletonian Stakes twice and the Little Brown Jug three times. He later served as president of Hanover Shoe Farms.

== Early life ==
John F. Simpson was born in Chester, South Carolina, United States in 1919.

== Career ==
Simpson was the fourth generation of his family to become involved in horse racing. He started out on the major metropolitan New York tracks for several seasons. He became known for his tactical ability and composed driving style which made him a leading competitor. His skill as a driver attracted prominent owners, leading to opportunities on the Grand Circuit. He won major colt stakes against leading horsemen of the era, including Ben White, Tom Berry, Fred Egan, and Frank Ervin.

The South Carolinian moved into Orlando, Florida in 1947 when Ben White Raceway was opened. He was the leading dash driver at Roosevelt Raceway during the 1949 season. He finished the 1951 season as the leading money-winning driver. Simpson, then 31, managed a 50-horse public stable. He set a single-season earnings record of $333,136.25 while winning 118 races, the most of any driver that season.

=== Hanover Shoe Farms ===
In August 1951, Simpson was selected to become general manager of Hanover Shoe Farms by its president, Lawrence B. Sheppard. He continued operating his public stable until November 1951, closing it down before beginning his duties at the farm in Hanover, Pennsylvania.

After ranking 21st among the leading money-winning drivers in 1953, Simpson increased his earnings to $180,907.10 in 1954. He ranked sixth in money won that season and eighth among the leading race winners with 78 victories. His son, John Simpson Jr., joined him in 1955 and worked as his second trainer, assisting with training each year. He ranked fourth on the list of the leading money-winning drivers of 1955.

Simpson captured his first victory in the Little Brown Jug with Noble Adios in 1956. At the end of the season, he ranked second in earnings with $455,301, behind Billy Haughton. He secured his second consecutive Little Brown Jug victory by guiding Torpid to the 1957 title. He also won the 1957 Hambletonian Stakes with Hickory Smoke. He drove the three-year-old colt for owners L. B. Sheppard and A. C. Mudge before a record crowd of 31,150 at the DuQuoin State Fairgrounds Racetrack. He won 119 races during the season with earnings of $483,164. He won the Little Brown Jug for the third time with Bullet Hanover in 1960. He was the leading two-minute driver for the 1960 season, reaching two-minutes or faster a total of 15 times.

In 1962, Simpson drove Thor Hanover to victory in the $169,000 Messenger Stakes, then the largest purse in harness racing history.

The veteran horseman went on to win the Hambletonian for the second time in 1964 with Ayres. He secured the Trotting Triple Crown as part of his 1964 campaign. He became the third driver to sweep the series by winning the Hambletonian, Kentucky Futurity, and Yonkers Trot.

When L. B. Sheppard died in 1968, Simpson became the president of Hanover Shoe Farms. His first major acquisition came in late 1968 with the purchase of the young pacer Best Of All. He expanded the stallion roster in 1970 by adding Columbia George and Steady Star, then acquired Super Bowl and Albatross in 1972. He served as president of Hanover Shoe Farms Inc. for 24 years.

Beginning in 1971, he served on the board of directors of the Hambletonian Society. He was also on the original Breeders Crown committee that helped to establish the annual Breeders Crown championship series.

== Death ==
J. F. Simpson Sr. died on August 28, 1995, in Orlando, Florida, United States.

== Legacy ==
Simpson made history in 1942 by becoming the youngest harness driver to break the two-minute barrier.

He won the Hambletonian Stakes twice and the Little Brown Jug three times. By winning the Little Brown Jug in 1957, Simpson became the first driver to capture the race in consecutive years.

He was inducted into the United States Harness Racing Hall of Fame in 1972.

In 2014, the trophy for the Breeders Crown Three-Year-Old Filly Trot was named in his memory.
