= Green Speed =

Standardbred racehorse

Green Speed (December 18, 1974 - June 27, 1983) was a Standardbred trotter owned by Mrs. Beverly Loyds and who was trained by Billy Haughton. Although not eligible for the Kentucky Futurity, the colt's racing success included wins in the other two legs of the 1977 U.S. Trotting Triple Crown, the Hambletonian Stakes and the Yonkers Trot. In that three-year-old campaign Green Speed finished the season holding thirteen world records including a record time of 1:55 3/5 which made him the then fastest three-year-old trotter in history. As a result, Green Speed was voted the 1977 American Harness Horse of the Year.

In 2014 Green Speed was inducted into the United States Harness Racing Hall of Fame.
