= Ralph N. Baldwin =

American harness racing driver (1916–1982)

Ralph Baldwin
Personal information
- Born: Ralph N. Baldwin; February 25 , 1916 Lloydminster, Saskatchewan, Canada
- Died: September 26, 1982 Pompano Beach, Florida, U.S.
- Occupation: Harness racing driver
- Years active: 1933-1969

Horse racing career
- Sport: Harness racing
- Career wins: 1,146

Major racing wins
- Championship Stallion Stake (1948, 1949); Horseman Futurity (1948, 1949, 1951, 1956, 1957, 1958, 1960, 1961, 1963, 1964); Kentucky Futurity (1948, 1949, 1956, 1959, 1963); Old Oaken Bucket (1949); Yonkers Trot (1957, 1963); Matron Stake (1951, 1956, 1957, 1958, 1963); Dexter Cup (1960, 1963); Walnut Hall Cup (1962, 1965, 1975); Hambletonian Stakes (1963, 1973); Trotting Triple Crown (1963); Fox Stake (1963); Messenger Stakes (1964); Cane Pace (1964); Colonial Trot (1973)

Honors
- United States Harness Racing Hall of Fame (1972); Canadian Horse Racing Hall of Fame (1977)

Significant horses
- Speedy Scot; Dartmouth; Flirth; Race Time

Ralph Baldwin (February 25 , 1916 – September 26, 1982) was a Canadian-born harness racing driver and horse trainer.

== Early life and education ==
Ralph N. Baldwin was born on February 25, 1916, in Lloydminster, Saskatchewan, Canada.

As the son of Homer Baldwin, who owned trotters in Canada, he took up driving at 15. Ralph's father taught him the fundamentals of horse training. In 1933, the high school student won his first harness race at Dufferin Park Racetrack in Toronto, Ontario.

The Saskatchewan native graduated from high school in Lloydminster in 1934.

== Career ==
Early in his racing career, Baldwin raced at state and county fairs in Minnesota, Wisconsin, Michigan, Ohio, and Indiana. While working for Archie F. Simonson of Grand Forks in 1938–39, he trained Doctor Baker, his first Grand Circuit horse. The young trainer emerged as a nationally recognized figure in the early 1940s, largely through his association with the pacer which had won 16 of 17 starts.

He drove for Leo C. McNamara's Two Gaits Farm in Carmel, Indiana in 1941. By the summer of 1942, he was driving for Art Sherrier of Lafayette and stood among the leading winners on the Midwest half-mile circuit.

During World War II, he served in the U.S. Army from 1942 to 1946 as a combat infantryman, earning two Bronze Stars and three European Theater battle stars. He was deployed in France, Germany, and Belgium.

=== Saunders Mills Stable ===
Baldwin went on to train and drive trotters owned by C.M. Saunders for Saunders Mills Stable of Toledo, Ohio. At 32 years old, he topped the 1948 Grand Circuit season as the leading money-winning driver with over $140,000 in major sulky purses. He was the first driver to do so in his initial full year on the circuit.

Beginning in 1948, Baldwin established himself as the leading reinsman in the Horseman Futurity at the annual Indiana State Fair in Indianapolis. He won the event in both 1948 (Egan Hanover) and 1949 (Bangaway) while driving for Saunders Mills. He also won the 1949 Horseman Futurity for three-year-old pacers with Stormyway. His first Hambletonian Stakes eligible was Egan Hanover, who finished third in 1948. He recorded multiple victories in the Kentucky Futurity, winning two back-to-back in 1948 with Egan Hanover and in 1949 with Bangaway. In 1949, he guided Bangaway to a win in the Old Oaken Bucket for three-year-old colt trotters.

=== Two Gaits Farm ===
With the McNamara stable's move onto the Grand Circuit, he went back to Two Gaits. He entered into a contract in November 1949 to race the 1950 season for Leo C. McNamara.

Baldwin captured the Horseman Futurity with Scotch Rhythm (1951), Nimble Colby (1956), Hoot Song (1957), and Sandalwood (1958) while with Two Gaits. He won the Kentucky Futurity again in 1956 with Nimble Colby and 1959 with Diller Hanover.

He trained four successive winners of the Matron Stake for three-year-old trotters at the Missouri State Fair in Sedalia, Missouri: Nimble Colby (1956), Hoot Song (1957), Sandalwood (1958), and Diller Hanover (1959).

In the 1957 Hambletonian Stakes at DuQuoin State Fairgrounds Racetrack, he guided Hoot Song, owned by Two Gaits Farm, to a runner-up finish. He handled the training of Diller Hanover and Tie Silk in 1959 and chose Tie Silk for the Hambletonian drive, finishing second, while Frank Ervin drove Diller Hanover to victory. The following year, he trained Quick Song and Carlene Hanover and opted to drive the filly, with Quick Song taking runner-up honors.

Following the withdrawal of Two Gaits from competition, he moved into another role.

=== Castleton Farm ===
Baldwin became head trainer at Castleton Farm near Lexington, Kentucky in the fall of 1960. He took the position once held by Sep Palin. At Castleton, he handled and raced the stable's "Big Three", Race Time, Dartmouth, and Speedy Scot, until their retirement to stud after the 1965 season.

The Castleton Farm trainer-driver added Horseman Futurity wins with Quick Song (1960), Spectator (1961), Speedy Scot (1963), and Dartmouth (1964). He competed in both pacing and trotting events. He won the 1963 Fox Stake for two-year-old pacers with Race Time, posting a 1:58 time, ranking among the track's fastest race and pacing miles. He also drove Spectator to a 1:59¾ trotting mile in 1961 and Speedy Scot to a 1:59½ trotting mile in 1963.

==== Speedy Scot ====
He developed Speedy Scot, the farm's leading champion and winner of the 1963 Hambletonian. It was Baldwin's first Hambletonian on his 13th attempt. He secured a world-record 1:56 4/5 mile with Speedy Scot that year, followed by a sweep of the Trotting Triple Crown and recognition as trainer-driver of the 1963 Harness Horse of the Year. His success with Speedy Scot carried into 1964, when he became the first driver to win the Founder's Plate series at Roosevelt Raceway in Westbury, New York, a series requiring successive wins in the track's major stakes at ages two, three, and four. On September 12, 1964, Baldwin drove Speedy Scot to a 2:02.3 mile at Freehold Raceway, setting a new track record and earning a $1,000 bonus for the record breaking entry. Baldwin was sidelined for a month in a Lexington hospital after suffering a heart attack in September 1964, and upon discharge, his first visit was to Speedy Scot.

He secured a second Founder's Plate in 1965 following his victory in the $100,000 Realization Trot for four-year-olds with Dartmouth.

In 1969, Baldwin suffered a second heart attack. He retired as trainer-driver for Castleton Farm. During his 11-year tenure at Castleton, he won 119 major stakes races.

=== Arden Homestead Stable ===
At the request of Arden Homestead Stable's owners, including E. Roland Harriman, he came out of retirement to run the stable. In 1970, Baldwin became head trainer for the Arden Homestead Stable of Goshen, succeeding Harry Pownall. He concentrated on the training and development of trotting colts.

At age 57, he captured the 1973 Hambletonian Stakes with Flirth, marking his second Hambletonian victory in 18 attempts in the race.

== Death ==
Baldwin died on September 26, 1982, in Pompano Beach, Florida, United States, at age 66.

== Legacy ==
His record included 10 victories across 17 years of the Horseman Futurity for three-year-old trotters, while no other driver had won it more than three times since its founding in 1907.

Baldwin was a two-time winner of the Hambletonian Stakes. Hambletonian winners Diller Hanover (1959), Speedy Scot (1963) and Flirth (1973) were all trained by Baldwin. Following his success with Speedy Scot, he was named 1963 Horseman of the Year through a ballot of readers of the Horseman & Fairworld.

In 1972, he became the 16th member to be inducted into the United States Harness Writers Association Living Hall of Fame.
