= Delvin Miller =

Driver, trainer and owner in harness racing

Del Miller
Personal information
- Born: July 15, 1913 Woodland, California
- Died: August 19, 1996 (aged 83) Orlando, Florida
- Occupations: Harness racing driver, trainer, owner & breeder

Horse racing career
- Sport: Horse racing

Major racing wins
- American Pacing Classic (1956); Dexter Cup (1974); Canadian Trotting Classic (1980) U.S. Pacing Triple Crown wins: Little Brown Jug (1950, 1951, 1952); Messenger Stakes (1957, 1958, 1960); Cane Pace (1960) U.S. Trotting Triple Crown wins: Hambletonian Stakes (1950, 1953, 1961); Kentucky Futurity (1954); Yonkers Trot (1960, 1974)

Honours
- United States Harness Racing Hall of Fame (1969); Little Brown Jug Wall of Fame (1987); Pennsylvania Sports Hall of Fame (1999); Delvin Miller Museum, Avella, Pennsylvania

Significant horses
- Adios, Countess Adios, Dotties Pick, Dudley Hanover, Meadow Rice, Tar Heel, Romeo Hanover
- Updated on December 4, 2016

Delvin Glenn "Del" Miller (July 15, 1913 – August 19, 1996) was a driver, trainer and owner in the sport of harness racing as well as an important breeder after acquiring Adios to stand at his Meadow Lands Farm in Meadow Lands, Pennsylvania. During a career that spanned eight decades, Miller won major races in the United States as well as in France. He was the founder of The Meadows racetrack in Meadow Lands, Pennsylvania where in 1997 the Adios Pace was officially renamed the Delvin Miller Adios Pace to honor his memory.

Del Miller was inducted into the United States Harness Racing Hall of Fame in 1969. He died in 1996 and was interred in the Cross Creek Cemetery in Cross Creek, Pennsylvania.
