= Su Mac Lad =

American Standardbred racehorse

Su Mac Lad (c. 1954 – September 19, 1982) was an American gelding trotter. He reached the peak of his racing career in the 1960s. In 1962, he was harness racing's career money leader and named United States Harness Horse of the Year. He won the International Trot held at Roosevelt Raceway in both 1961 and 1963, and was recognized in both of those years as trotter of year.

Su Mac Lad was owned by I. W. Berkemeyer of New Milford, New Jersey, who purchased the gelding in 1959, and was trained and driven by Stanley Dancer. Su Mac Lad had a distinct lack of classical horseracing pedigree, having been born on a nondescript farm owned by Mrs. Paul Davis, a breeder in Henderson, Illinois. He was sold as a two-year-old for $750 and was purchased by Berkemeyer in 1959 for $35,000.

In a six-horse field at the 1961 International Trot, Su Mac Lad, driven by Dancer, finished in a time of 2:34.4 in driving rain and a sloppy track in front of 28,105 racing fans, with the French horse Kracovie in second by what The New York Times called "the smallest of noses" with Canadian horse Tie Silk in third. The victory made Su Mac Lad the first American horse to take the title. This was the third annual running of the race, described as having "blossomed into one of the world's blue-ribbon harness racing events".

In the first American sweep in the series, the lightly regarded Tie Silk, who had finished in third the previous year and sixth the year before, won the $50,000 race in front of a crowd of 53,279. Six-year-old Tie Silk, driven by Keith Waples, won in a time of 2:34.2, with favorite and returning winner Su Mac Lad in second and world record holder Porterhouse in third.

Su Mac Lad, returned to win the 1963 running of the International Trot in a seven-horse field, before a crowd of 41,197. Driven by Stanley Dancer, Su Mac Lad paid bettors $2.90 to win in tying a world record at the 1¼-mile distance with a time of 2:32.6. The 9-to-20 favorite came in a half-length ahead of Martini II who in turn beat Tie Silk by 7½ lengths. The $25,000 Su Mac Lad took home brought his career winnings to $687,549, the most of any pacer or trotter as of that date.

At the time of his retirement in 1965, Su Mac Lad was the sport's leading career money earner with $885,695 brought in during a total of 151 races, with the horse winning 68 times, coming in second on 32 occasions and taking third 18 times.

In 1988 Su Mac Lad was inducted into the United States Harness Racing Hall of Fame.

Su Mac Lad died at age 28 on September 19, 1982, at Stanley Dancer's farm where he resided following his retirement from professional racing.
