= Nevele Pride =

American Standardbred racehorse

- Breed: Standardbred
- Sire: Star's Pride
- Grandsire: Worthy Boy
- Dam: Thankful
- Damsire: Hoot Mon
- Sex: Stallion
- Foaled: 1965
- Died: 1993
- Country: United States
- Color: Brown
- Owner: Stanley Dancer
- Trainer: Stanley Dancer
- Record: 57 wins
- Earnings: US$873,350

Major wins
- Hambletonian Stakes (1968); Yonkers Futurity (1968); Kentucky Futurity (1968)

Awards
- United States Harness Horse of the Year (1967, 1968, 1969)

Honors
- United States Harness Racing Hall of Fame (1994)
- Last updated on 2016-05-07

Nevele Pride (1965 – February 19, 1993) was an American standardbred harness racehorse who set world records as fastest trotter on multiple occasions. Owned by Stanley Dancer, Nevele Pride won 57 races and was honored as Harness Horse of the Year in three consecutive years. The horse earned more than $870,000 during his racing career.

== Background ==
Nevele Pride was the son of Star's Pride and Thankful. Dancer first saw Nevele Pride in 1966 on a farm in Pennsylvania when he was as a yearling. He bought the horse for $20,000. The horse was co-owned by Nevele Acres and Louis Resnick of Ellenville, New York. Nevele Pride enjoyed hot dogs, beer and cigarettes, which he would eat and not smoke.

== Racing career ==
Having already won that year's Hambletonian and the Yonkers Futurity, on October 4, 1968, Nevele Pride won both heats of the Kentucky Futurity in identical times of 1:57 in the one-mile distance to win the Triple Crown of Harness Racing for Trotters, With Snow Speed in second and Larengo in third in both heats. The times set a world record by a trotter for two heats by a horse of any age.

Nevele Pride won the $88,000 Realization Trot at Roosevelt Raceway on August 2, 1969, by five lengths, setting a world record in the 1 1/16 mile distance of 2:07.4, breaking the previous record of 2:08:4 set on the same track in 1966 by Perfect Freight. Dancer led Nevele Pride from the gate in the six-horse field, paying $2.40 to win to the many in the crowd of nearly 40,000 fans.

Using three thoroughbred horses to maintain his pace, Dancer broke the record for the mile distance by a harness horse, riding the track at the Indiana State Fairgrounds on August 31, 1969, in a time of 1:54 4/5, in front of a crowd of 12,000. The three prompters were driven by Del Miller, Billy Haughton and Vernon Dancer. The time broke the record of 1:55¼ held by Greyhound and set in a time trial at The Red Mile in Lexington, Kentucky, on September 29, 1938.

== Retirement and stud record ==
Nevele Pride retired in ceremonies held on October 17, 1969, at Monticello Raceway, the site of his 57th win in 67 starts when he won by 6½ lengths on September 27. His $871,738 in earnings placed him third in harness racing history behind the French horse Roquepine with $956, 161 and Su Mac Lad's $885,095. Norman S. Woolworth of New Canaan, Connecticut, led a 20-person syndicate that purchased the rights to the horse for $3 million, a record for a standardbred stallion. After his retirement, Nevele Pride was shipped to Stoner Creek Stud in Paris, Kentucky.

His foal Nevele Thunder was syndicated for a record $1.5 million in 1975, setting a record for a 2-year-old harness horse. The horse was purchased by Nevele Holiday Stable, a group led by Stanley Dancer. The horse had won 18 of 21 races by the time of his purchase.

In 1994, Nevele Pride was inducted into the United States Harness Racing Hall of Fame.

Nevele Pride died on February 19, 1993, in Lexington, Kentucky, and was laid to rest at Stoner Creek Stud, alongside the great pacing sire Meadow Skipper and the Thoroughbred champion Count Fleet.
