= Scott Zeron =

Canadian harness racer (born 1989)

Personal information
- Nickname: The Money Man
- Nationality: Canadian
- Born: Oakville, Ontario
- Occupation: Harness racing driver

Horse racing career
- Sport: Horse racing

Major racing wins
- Hambletonian (2016, 2018, 2023); NA Cup (2019, 2023); Little Brown Jug (2012, 2023); Tattersalls Pace (2019); US Pacing Championships (2016, 2018, 2021); Yonkers Trot (2016); Cane Pace (2019); KY Filly Futurity (2018); Sam Mckee Memorial (2016, 2018, 2021); Hambletonian Maturity (2017); Governors Cup (2014, 2017, 2018, 2022); Metro Pace (2014, 2017, 2021); KY Futurity (2023); Breeders Crown 7x Canadian Pacing Derby (2024); Canadian Trotting Classic (2024)

Racing awards
- W.R. Haughton Good Guy Award; Dan Patch Award; Hambletonian Society Awards

Honors
- U.S. Driver of the Year (2023); USHWA Driver of the Year

Significant horses
- Marion Marauder; It's My Show; Atlanta; Tactical Approach; Captain Crunch; Michael’s Power; Lost In Time; Monti Miki; Tactical Mounds; Rocknificent; Periculum

Scott Zeron (born May 23, 1989) is a Canadian born harness racing driver.

== Early life and education ==
Scott Zeron was born on May 23, 1989, in Oakville, Ontario, Canada. He comes from a family with roots in harness racing, as his father, Rick Zeron, was a trainer and driver in the sport. Growing up around horses and the racetrack, Scott developed a passion for harness racing at the age of 12. He graduated with a diploma from Humber College (Ontario).

== Career ==
Zeron made his debut at Hanover Raceway, steering a horse called Weird Albert in 2007. In 2023, he won the $850,000 Little Brown Jug, completing a sweep of the Delaware Fair classics for trainer Linda Toscano. He is nicknamed "The Money Man," for a track record of winning major stakes in harness racing. On three occasions, Zeron has won the prestigious Hambletonian Stakes. In 2016, he piloted Marion Marauder and achieved the Trotting Triple Crown. Two years later Zeron won the Hambletonian guiding Atlanta to victory for his father Rick. Zeron drove It's My Show to victory in the $1 million North America Cup in Canada in 2023.

In 2022, Zeron suffered a broken wrist and a dislocated shoulder after an accident at Pocono Downs. According to USTA numbers, he has driven winners of over $105 million.

Completed the rare feat of winning the Little Brown Jug for colts and Juggette for fillies on same day 2024. The only other drivers to accomplish this are HOF driver David Miller & Bill Haughton.

Zeron has won the prestigious Hambletonian Stakes 3 times with Marian Marauder, Atlanta, & Tactical Approach. Every driver to win the Hambletonian Stakes three times has been inducted into the Hall of Fame in Goshen.

Zeron along with HOF Driver Tim Tetrick are the only drivers in history of harness racing to win 3 - 1 Million Dollar Races in the same year. Zeron won the Hambletonian Stakes in 2024 with Tactical Approach, North America Cup with It's My Show and the Little Brown Jug with It's My Show.

== Awards & Recognition ==
- United States Harness Writers Association's recognition as the U.S. Driver of the Year in 2023
- W.R. Haughton Good Guy Award
- Dan Patch Award
- Hambletonian Society Awards
