= Lindy's Pride =

American Standardbred racehorse

- Breed: Standardbred
- Sire: Star's Pride
- Grandsire: Worthy Boy
- Dam: Galena Hanover
- Damsire: Spencer Scott
- Sex: Stallion
- Foaled: 1966
- Country: United States
- Colour: Bay
- Breeder: Hanover Shoe Farms
- Owner: Lindy Farms et al
- Trainer: Howard Beissinger
- Record: 47: 25-9-4
- Earnings: $396,209

Major wins
- Yonkers Trot (1969); Hambletonian Stakes (1969); Kentucky Futurity (1969)

Awards
- Three-Year-Old Colt Trotter of the year (1969)

Honors
- Harness Racing Museum & Hall of Fame (2002)

Lindy's Pride (1966 – June 25, 1997) was an American Standardbred racehorse and sire. He won the Triple Crown of Harness Racing for Trotters as a three-year-old in 1969 but was retired owing to chronic hoof problems a year later. He later became a successful breeding stallion.

== Background ==
Lindy's Pride was a bay horse bred in Pennsylvania by Hanover Shoe Farms and was originally given the name Galahad Hanover. As a yearling in 1967 he was bought for $15,500 by Lindy Farms in association with the Antonacci and the Lomangino families and renamed Lindy's Pride. During his track career he was trained by Howard Beissinger.

He was sired by Star's Pride out of the mare Galena Hanover, a daughter of Spencer Scott

== Racing career ==
=== 1968: two-year-old season ===
In his first season Lindy's Pride ran 24 times and won 13 races. The most significant of his successes came in the American-National Stakes, the Review Futurity and the Arden Downs.

=== 1969: three-year-old season ===
As a three-year-old Lindy's Pride became the fifth horse to win Triple Crown of Harness Racing for Trotters as he recorded victories in the Yonkers Futurity, the Hambletonian Stakes (in a career best time of 1:57.3) and the Kentucky Futurity. His trainer Howard Beissinger also drove the horse to success in the Triple Crown series. The colt also recorded major victories in the Dexter Cup and the Colonial.

Lindy's Pride was voted Three-Year-Old Colt Trotter of 1969, but lost out to the outstanding six-year-old mare Fresh Yankee in the polling to determine the American Harness Horse of the Year award.

=== 1970: four-year-old season ===
Lindy's Pride began his third season in good form and recorded a win over Fresh Yankee. He was then sent to Europe with the Elitloppet in Sweden as his principal target. He managed one second place from three starts, but his quarter cracks, which had plagued him throughout his career, had deteriorated to the point that he could not continue racing. He was retired to become a breeding stallion in Kentucky.

== Stud record ==
During his stud career Lindy's Pride was based at Almahurst Farm and then Castleton Farm. The stallion had some problems with fertility but did sire approximately 500 foals. The best of his offspring included Lindy's Crown, Cornstalk, Lola's Express, Spring Dash, Glencoe Pride and Elmsford.

Lindy's Pride, died at Lindy Farms in Connecticut on June 25, 1997 at the age of thirty-one.

He was inducted into the Harness Racing Hall of Fame in 2002.

== Pedigree ==
Pedigree of Lindy's Pride (USA), bay stallion, 1966
| Sire Stars Pride 1947 | Worthy Boy; 1940 | Volomite | Peter Volo |
| Sire Stars Pride 1947 | Worthy Boy; 1940 | Volomite | Cita Frisco |
| Sire Stars Pride 1947 | Worthy Boy; 1940 | Warwell Worthy | Peter the Brewer |
| Sire Stars Pride 1947 | Worthy Boy; 1940 | Warwell Worthy | Alma Lee |
| Sire Stars Pride 1947 | Stardrift; 1936 | Mr McElwyn | Guy Axworthy |
| Sire Stars Pride 1947 | Stardrift; 1936 | Mr McElwyn | Widow Maggie |
| Sire Stars Pride 1947 | Stardrift; 1936 | Dillcicso | San Francisco |
| Sire Stars Pride 1947 | Stardrift; 1936 | Dillcicso | Dilworthy |
| Dam Galena Hanover 1948 | Spencer Scott; 1937 | Scotland | Peter Scott |
| Dam Galena Hanover 1948 | Spencer Scott; 1937 | Scotland | Roya McKinney |
| Dam Galena Hanover 1948 | Spencer Scott; 1937 | May Spencer | Spencer |
| Dam Galena Hanover 1948 | Spencer Scott; 1937 | May Spencer | Guyellen |
| Dam Galena Hanover 1948 | Grace Hanover; 1929 | Dillon Axworthy | Axworthy |
| Dam Galena Hanover 1948 | Grace Hanover; 1929 | Dillon Axworthy | Adioo Dillon |
| Dam Galena Hanover 1948 | Grace Hanover; 1929 | Great Medium | Peter the Great |
| Dam Galena Hanover 1948 | Grace Hanover; 1929 | Great Medium | Dorsch Medium |
