= Hambletonian Stakes =

Annual American harness horse race

- Class: Grade I
- Location: Harrah's Hoosier Park; Anderson, Indiana (starting 2027)
- Inaugurated: 1926 (100 years ago) at the New York State Fair, Syracuse, New York
- Race type: Standardbred (Trot)
- Website: www.hambletonian.com

Race information
- Distance: 1 mile (8.0 furlongs)
- Surface: Dirt
- Track: Left-handed
- Qualification: 3-year-olds
- Purse: $1,000,000 (2026)

The Hambletonian Stakes is a major American harness race for three-year-old trotting horses, named in honor of Hambletonian 10, a foundation sire of the Standardbred horse breed, also known as the "Father of the American Trotter." It is part of the Triple Crown of Harness Racing for Trotters and typically run on the first Saturday in August.

As of 2027, the Hambletonian will be held at Hoosier Park in Anderson, Indiana. It was previously held at the Meadowlands Racetrack in East Rutherford, New Jersey, from 1981 to 2026.

== Sites ==
The Hambletonian first took place at the New York State Fair in Syracuse in 1926. The race switched from Syracuse to Lexington, Kentucky for the 1927 and 1929 races, however, because of rainouts. Starting in 1930, Good Time Park in Goshen, New York hosted the race until 1956 with the exception of 1943. That year, The Hambletonian was raced at Empire City Race Track, which became Yonkers Raceway in 1950, because of wartime gas rationing. The Du Quoin State Fair in Du Quoin, Illinois gained the rights to host the race in 1957 and held on to it until 1980. From 1981 until 2026, the race was held at the Meadowlands Racetrack in East Rutherford, New Jersey.

Following the 2026 Hambletonian, the Hambletonian Society voted to move the race to Hoosier Park in Indiana for three years beginning in 2027. This came after their contract with the Meadowlands expired, and the New Jersey track declined to exercise its exclusive right to renewal. John Campbell, a retired harness racing driver who has won the Hambletonian a record six times and served as president and CEO of the Hambletonian Society at the time of the announcement, said that "no decision regarding the Hambletonian is taken lightly," but that the board accepted a proposal from Hoosier Park and standardbred interests in Indiana "that will only guarantee continued opportunity and growth for the Hambletonian and the sport."

== Records ==
Most wins by a driver

- 6 – John Campbell (1987, 1988, 1990, 1995, 1998, 2006)

Most wins by a trainer

- 5 – shared by:
  - Billy Haughton (1974, 1976, 1977, 1980, 1982)
  - Ben White (1927, 1933, 1936, 1942, 1943)
  - Stanley Dancer (1965, 1968, 1972, 1975, 1983)

Stakes record

- 1:49 2/5 – Apex (2026)

== Hambletonian Stakes winners ==
Year	Winner	Driver	Trainer	Owner	Time	Purse
2026	Apex	Dexter Dunn	Marcus Melander	Jeff Snyder, S R F Stable & Steve Stewart	1:49 2/5	$1,000,000
2025	Nordic Catcher S	Ake Svanstedt	Ake Svanstedt	Ake Svanstedt Inc., Little E LLC	1:50 0/0	$1,000,000
2024	Karl	Yannick Gingras	Nancy Takter	Nancy Takter, Christina Takter, Crawford Farms Racing, Black Horse Racing & Bender Sweden	1:51 3/5	$1,000,000
2023	Tactical Approach	Scott Zeron	Nancy Takter	Fielding, LeBlanc, Sbrocco, JAF Racing	1:50 3/5	$1,000,000
2022	Cool Papa Bell	Todd McCarthy	Jim Campbell	Scott Farber	1:51 3/5	$1,000,000
2021	Captain Corey	Ake Svanstedt	Ake Svanstedt	SRF, Knutsson, Midnight Sun, Svanstedt	1:51 0/0	$1,000,000
2020	Ramona Hill	Andy McCarthy	Tony Alagna	Grant, Crawford Farms, Leblanc & In The Gym Partners	1:50 1/5	$1,000,000
2019	Forbidden Trade	Bob McClure	Luc Blais	Serge Godin & Distinction Capital	1:51 0/5	$1,000,000
2018	Atlanta	Scott Zeron	Rick Zeron	Rick Zeron, Crawford Fms, Holland	1:50 4/5	$1,000,000
2017	Perfect Spirit (Note: What The Hill finished first but was disqualified for interference. It was the first disqualification of the first-placed horse in the race's history.)	Åke Svanstedt	Åke Svanstedt	Srf Stable, Delray Beach, FL	1:50 3/5	$1,000,000
2016	Marion Marauder	Scott Zeron	Paula Wellwood	Wellwood, Keeler	1:51 4/5	$1,000,000
2015	Pinkman	Brian Sears	Jimmy Takter	Takter, Fielding, McClelland, Liverman	1:51 0/5	$1,000,000
2014	Trixton	Jimmy Takter	Jimmy Takter	Brixton Medical Ab (Bengt Agerup) & Christina Takter	1:50 3/5	$1,006,125
2013	Royalty For Life	Brian Sears	George Ducharme	Al Ross, Chip Campbell, Jr., Paul Fountaine	1:52 1/5	$1,000,000
2012	Market Share	Tim Tetrick	Linda Toscano	Gutnick, TLP Stable, Augustine	1:52 1/5	$1,500,000
2011	Broad Bahn	George Brennan	Noel Daley	Fam Alber Horse Racing LLC (Leif Alber)	1:53 0/0	$1,500,000
2010	Muscle Massive	Ronald Pierce	Jimmy Takter	Brixton Medical, Order By Stable et al.	1:51 0/0	$1,500,000
2009	Muscle Hill	Brian Sears	Gregory B. Peck	TLP Stable, Silva, Southwind Farm, Muscle Hill Racing	1:50 1/5	$1,520,333
2008	Deweycheatumnhowe	Ray Schnittker	Ray Schnittker	Schnittker, Iannazzo, Gewertz, Baldassare & Deweycheatumnhowe Stable	1:52 0/0	$1,500,000
2007	Donato Hanover	Ronald Pierce	Steve Elliott	(Lessees) Steve Arnold, David Scharf, Golden Touch Stables	1:53 2/5	$1,500,000
2006	Glidemaster	John Campbell	Blair Burgess	Robert Burgess, Karin-Olsson Burgess, Marsha Cohen, Brittany Farms	1:51 1/5	$1,500,000
2005	Vivid Photo	Roger Hammer	Roger Hammer	Roger Hammer, Todd Schadel	1:52 3/5	$1,500,000
2004	Windsong's Legacy	Trond Smedshammer	Trond Smedshammer	Ann Brannvoll, Ted Gewertz, Patricia Spinelli	1:54 1/5	$1,000,000
2003	Amigo Hall	Michel Lachance	Blair Burgess	Walnut Hall Limited (Alan J. Leavitt), Robert Burgess, Karin Olsson-Burgess	1:54 0/0	$1,000,000
2002	Chip Chip Hooray	Eric Ledford	Charles Sylvester	C. Sylvester, M. Prakas, Wingedfoot Farms, N. Goldman	1:53 3/5	$1,000,000
2001	Scarlet Knight	Stefan Melander	Stefan Melander	Stefan Melander	1:53 4/5	$1,000,000
2000	Yankee Paco	Trevor Ritchie	Douglas McIntosh	Harry Ivey & Dr. Tom Ivey	1:53 2/5	$1,000,000
1999	Self Possessed	Michel Lachance	Ron Gurfein	Self Possessed Stable (D. Scharf, J. Silva, L. Domiano, G. Segal)	1:51 3/5	$1,000,000
1998	Muscles Yankee	John Campbell	Charles Sylvester	Perretti Farms Inc, Irving G. Liverman & David French	1:52 2/5	$1,000,000
1997	Malabar Man	Malvern C. Burroughs	Jimmy Takter	Malvern C. Burroughs	1:55 0/0	$1,000,000
1996	Continentalvictory	Michel Lachance	Ron Gurfein	Continentalvictory Stable	1:52 1/5	$1,200,000
1995	Tagliabue	John Campbell	Jim Campbell	Arlene & Jules J. Siegel	1:54 4/5	$1,200,000
1994	Victory Dream	Michel Lachance	Ron Gurfein	FA Stable (Frank Antonacci) & Victory Dream Stable (Alan J. Leavitt, et al.)	1:54 1/5	$1,200,000
1993	American Winner	Ronald Pierce	Milton Smith	Robert Key, John Glesmann	1:53 1/5	$1,200,000
1992	Alf Palema	Mickey McNichol	Per Eriksson	Karl-Erik Bender, Per Eriksson	1:56 2/5	$1,288,000
1991	Giant Victory	Jack Moiseyev	Per Eriksson	Jacqueline & Theodore Gewertz, Robins Racing Stable	1:54 4/5	$1,238,000
1990	Harmonious	John Campbell	Osvaldo Formia	Lindy Racing Stable, Sal Garofalo	1:54 1/5	$1,346,000
1989	Park Avenue Joe (DH)	Ron Waples	Charles Sylvester	Park Avenue Stable	2:00 2/5	$1,131,000
1989	Probe (DH)	William Fahy	Osvaldo Formia	Lindy Farms	2:00 2/5	
1988	Armbro Goal	John Campbell	Jan Johnson	James R. Plate, Paul H. Ryan, Michael V. Caggiano	1:54 3/5	$1,156,800
1987	Mack Lobell	John Campbell	Charles Sylvester	One More Time Stable (Louis P. Guida, et al.) & Fair Winds Farm (E. Mullen)	1:53 3/5	$1,046,300
1986	Nuclear Kosmos	Ulf Thoresen	Per Henriksen	Lilla Henriksen, Geo. & Gary Hoffman, Stephen Sullivan	1:55 2/5	$1,172,082
1985	Prakas	Bill O'Donnell	Per Eriksson	Hans G. Enggren, Iain L. Mackenzie, Carl J. Vizzi	1:54 3/5	$1,272,000
1984	Historic Freight	Ben Webster	Samuel "Skip" Lewis	ABC Stables, Inc.	1:56 2/5	$1,219,000
1983	Duenna	Stanley Dancer	Stanley Dancer	Clearview Stable	1:57 2/5	$1,000,000
1982	Speed Bowl	Tommy Haughton	Billy Haughton	Pony Stable (B. Haughton, D. Miller, P. Soldner, F. Miller, M. Hempt, B. Brown)	1:56 4/5	$875,750
1981	Shiaway St. Pat	Ray Remmen	Ray Remmen	Shiawassee Farm, Inc.	2:01 1/5	$838,000
1980	Burgomeister	Billy Haughton	Billy Haughton	Peter Haughton	1:56 3/5	$293,570
1979	Legend Hanover	George Sholty	Ray Tripp	Messenger Stable (Raymond Galt)	1:56 1/5	$300,000
1978	Speedy Somolli	Howard Beissinger	Howard Beissinger	Ann Beissinger, Barbara Mumma, Alan J. Leavitt, William Rosenberg	1:55 0/0	$241,280
1977	Green Speed	Billy Haughton	Billy Haughton	Beverly Lloyds	1:55 3/5	$284,310
1976	Steve Lobell	Billy Haughton	Billy Haughton	Mill Island Stable (Richard Herman & Murray Siegel)	1:56 2/5	$263,524
1975	Bonefish	Stanley Dancer	Stanley Dancer	Stanley F. & Rachel L. Dancer & A. M. Cuddy Stable	1:59 0/0	$232,192
1974	Christopher T.	Billy Haughton	Billy Haughton	John L. Thro	1:58 3/5	$160,150
1973	Flirth	Ralph N. Baldwin	Ralph N. Baldwin	Arden Homestead Stable (E. Roland Harriman & Elbridge T. Gerry, Sr.)	1:57 1/5	$144,710
1972	Super Bowl	Stanley Dancer	Stanley Dancer	Rachel L. Dancer, Rose Hild Breeding Farm	1:56 2/5	$119,090
1971	Speedy Crown	Howard Beissinger	Howard Beissinger	Crown Stable, Inc. (Frank & Thomas Antonacci)	1:57 2/5	$129,770
1970	Timothy T.	John F. Simpson, Jr.	John F. Simpson, Sr.	John F. Simpson, Sr.	1:58 2/5	$143,630
1969	Lindy's Pride	Howard Beissinger	Howard Beissinger	Lindy Farm, Inc.	1:57 3/5	$124,910
1968	Nevele Pride	Stanley Dancer	Stanley Dancer	Nevele Acres, Louis Resnick	1:59 2/5	$116,190
1967	Speedy Streak	Del Cameron	Frank Ervin	Clarence F. Gaines, John R. Gaines, Kenneth D. Owen	2:00 0/0	$122,650
1966	Kerry Way	Frank Ervin	Frank Ervin	Gainesway Farm	1:58 4/5	$122,540
1965	Egyptian Candor	Del Cameron	Stanley Dancer	Rachel L. Dancer	2:03 4/5	$122,245
1964	Ayres	John F. Simpson, Sr.	John F. Simpson, Sr.	Charlotte Sheppard	1:56 4/5	$115,281
1963	Speedy Scot	Ralph N. Baldwin	Ralph N. Baldwin	Castleton Farm	1:57 3/5	$115,549
1962	A. C.'s Viking	Sanders Russell	Sanders Russell	Mr. & Mrs. Andrew C. Petersen	1:59 3/5	$116,612
1961	Harlan Dean	Jimmy Arthur	Delvin Miller	Max C. Hempt, Delvin Miller, Ray Cleveland	1:58 2/5	$131,573
1960	Blaze Hanover	Joe O'Brien	Joe O'Brien	S. A. Camp Farms	1:59 3/5	$147,481
1959	Diller Hanover	Frank Ervin	Ralph N. Baldwin	Hall Stables (Howard M. Hall)	2:01 1/5	$125,283
1958	Emily's Pride	Flave Nipe	Fred Egan	Castleton Farm & Walnut Hall Farm	1:59 4/5	$106,719
1957	Hickory Smoke	John F. Simpson Sr.	John F. Simpson, Sr.	Lawrence B. Sheppard & Archie Mudge	2:00 1/5	$111,126
1956	The Intruder	Ned Bower	Ned Bower	Allwood Stable	2:01 2/5	$100,603
1955	Scott Frost	Joe O'Brien	Joe O'Brien	S. A. Camp Farms	2:00 3/5	$86,863
1954	Newport Dream	Del Cameron	Del Cameron	Octave Blake	2:02 4/5	$106,830
1953	Helicopter	Harry M. Harvey	Delvin Miller	Armstrong Bros.	2:01 3/5	$117,117
1952	Sharp Note	Bion Shively	Bion Shively	Clyde W. Clark	2:02 3/5	$87,637
1951	Mainliner	Guy Crippen	Guy Crippen	Ralph H. Kroening	2:02 3/5	$95,263
1950	Lusty Song	Delvin Miller	Fay Fitzpatrick	Hayes Fair Acres	2:02 0/0	$75,209
1949	Miss Tilly	Fred Egan	Fred Egan	Charles W. Phellis	2:01 2/5	$69,791
1948	Demon Hanover	Harrison R. Hoyt	Harrison R. Hoyt	Mr. & Mrs. Harrison R. Hoyt	2:02 0/0	$59,941
1947	Hoot Mon	Scepter F. Palin	Scepter F. Palin	Castleton Farm	2:00 0/0	$46,267
1946	Chestertown	Thomas S. Berry	Harry P. Whitney	Walter E. Smith	2:02 1/2	$50,995
1945	Titan Hanover	Harry Pownall	Harry Pownall	Arden Homestead Stable (E. R. Harriman & E. T. Gerry, Sr.)	2:04 0/0	$50,196
1944	Yankee Maid	Henry Thomas	Henry Thomas	Arch L. Derby	2:04 0/0	$33,577
1943	Volo Song	Benjamin White	Benjamin White	William H. Strang, Jr.	2:02 1/2	$42,298
1942	The Ambassador	Benjamin White	Benjamin White	William H. Strang, Jr.	2:04 0/0	$38,954
1941	Bill Gallon	Lee Smith	Lee Smith	R. Horace Johnston	2:05 0/0	$38,729
1940	Spencer Scott	Fred Egan	Fred Egan	Charles W. Phellis	2:02 0/0	$43,658
1939	Peter Astra	Hugh M. "Doc" Parshall	Hugh M. "Doc" Parshall	Dr. Lowry M. Guilinger	2:04 1/4	$40,502
1938	Mc Lin	Henry Thomas	Henry Thomas	Hanover Shoe Farms	2:02 1/4	$37,962
1937	Shirley Hanover	Henry Thomas	Henry Thomas	Hanover Shoe Farms	2:01 1/2	$37,912
1936	Rosalind	Benjamin White	Benjamin White	Gib White	2:01 3/4	$35,643
1935	Greyhound	Scepter F. Palin	Scepter F. Palin	Edward J. Baker	2:02 1/4	$33,321
1934	Lord Jim	Hugh M. "Doc" Parshall	Hugh M. "Doc" Parshall	Earl L. Mefford	2:02 3/4	$25,845
1933	Mary Reynolds	Benjamin White	Benjamin White	William N. Reynolds	2:03 3/4	$40,459
1932	The Marchioness	William Caton	William Caton	Mrs. Ralph Keeler	2:01 1/4	$49,489
1931	Calumet Butler	Richard D. McMahon	Richard D. McMahon	Calumet Farm	2:03 1/4	$50,921
1930	Hanover's Bertha	Thomas S. Berry	Thomas S. Berry	Hanover Shoe Farms	2:03 0/0	$56,859
1929	Walter Dear	Walter Cox	Walter Cox	William H. Cane	2:02 3/4	$60,309
1928	Spencer	William H. Leese	William H. Leese	David M. Look	2:02 1/2	$66,226
1927	Iosola's Worthy	Marvin Childs	Benjamin White	E. J. Merkle	2:03 3/4	$54,694
1926	Guy McKinney	Nathaniel D. Ray	Nathaniel D. Ray	Henry B. Rea	2:04 3/4	$73,451
