= John Dodge House =

Building

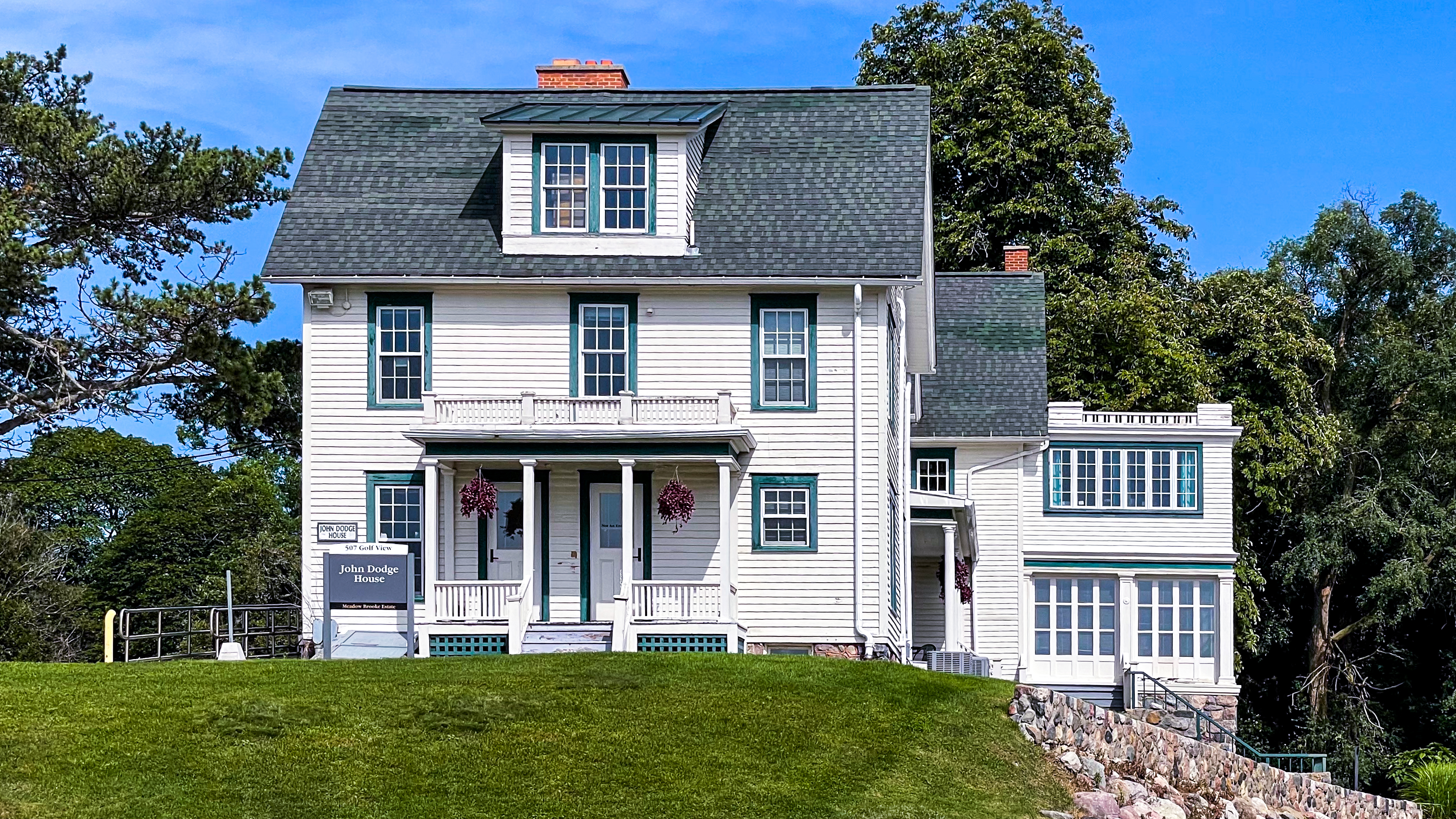
- (August 2021)
- Interactive map of the John Dodge House area

General information
- Location: Oakland University, east end of Golf View Lane
- Coordinates: 42°40′23″N 83°11′41″W
- Named for: John Francis Dodge
- Completed: 1898

The John Dodge House is a farmhouse on the campus of Oakland University in Rochester Hills, Michigan. It was built in the late 19th century and later purchased by automobile pioneer John Francis Dodge and his wife Matilda Dodge Wilson as a weekend retreat home. It currently functions as an administrative and faculty office building for the university.

== History ==
James L. Higgins purchased the land on which the house currently sits in 1896. He built the farmhouse in 1898 at a cost of $50,000. The Dodges purchased it a decade later in 1908, and expanded it from 14 rooms to 30.

Following Dodge's death in 1920, Matilda and her second husband Alfred Wilson further expanded the estate by building Meadow Brook Hall and other buildings. This area of Oakland University is known as Meadow Brook Farms and is on the National Register of Historic Places.

The John Dodge House has undergone renovations multiple times, most recently in 2000.
