= Rose Terrace (Grosse Pointe Farms, Michigan) =

Historic house in Michigan, United States

- Formerly listed on the U.S. National Register of Historic Places
- Michigan State Historic Site
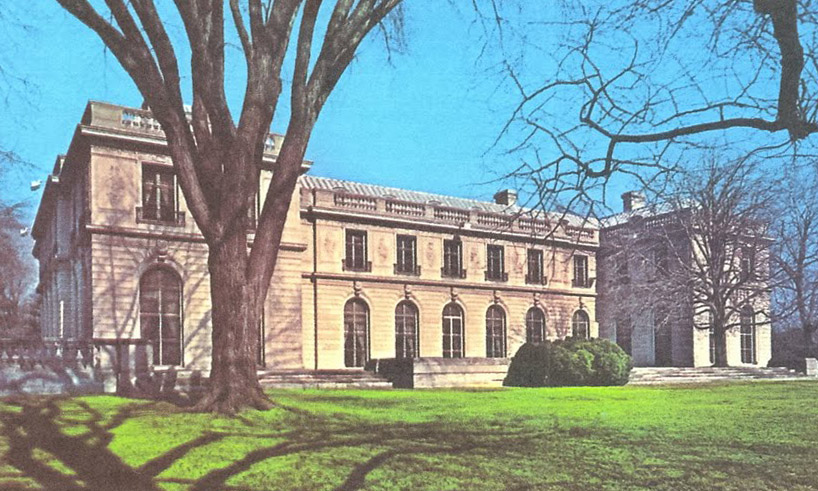
- Facade, c. 1971

- Location within Michigan Location within the United States
- Interactive map
- Location: 12 Lake Shore Dr., Grosse Pointe Farms, Michigan
- Coordinates: 42°23′7″N 82°54′0″W
- Area: 9 acres (3.6 ha)
- Built: 1931
- Built by: George A. Fuller Company
- Architect: Horace Trumbauer
- Demolished: 1976
- NRHP reference No.: 71001096

Significant dates
- Added to NRHP: 1971
- Designated MSHS: June 19, 1971
- Removed from NRHP: November 30, 1977

Rose Terrace was a private home located at 12 Lake Shore Drive in Grosse Pointe Farms, Michigan. Built in 1934 by Anna Dodge, widow of automobile pioneer Horace E. Dodge, it was designated a Michigan State Historic Site in 1971 and listed on the National Register of Historic Places in 1971. Despite this, the house was demolished in 1976.

== History ==
John and Horace Dodge were machinists and early suppliers to, and investors in, the Ford Motor Company. The Dodge Brothers became immensely wealthy, and in 1912, Horace Dodge and his wife Anna Thompson Dodge hired Albert Kahn to design a palatial red sandstone mansion on Jefferson Avenue in Detroit. The landscaping featured a series of terraces cascading down to Lake St. Clair. Anna Dodge filled them with roses and the mansion was subsequently dubbed "Rose Terrace."

In 1920, Horace Dodge died, leaving his fortune entirely to his widow, Anna. She continued to live at Rose Terrace, but was reportedly unhappy and lonely. In 1926, she married actor Hugh Dillman, and the couple decided to build a completely new mansion. They purchased the adjacent Country Club of Detroit and razed both the clubhouse and the original Rose Terrace in 1930. Anna and Hugh spent two years in Europe, advised by prominent art dealer Joseph Duveen, collecting art, material, and inspiration for their new mansion. They hired architect Horace Trumbauer of Philadelphia to design the new mansion and the George A. Fuller Company of New York City to supervise construction, which began in 1931. The mansion was completed in 1934 at a cost of $4 million (equivalent to $96 million in 2025).

However, even before the new Rose Terrace was completed, Hugh and Anna's marriage soured. They divorced in 1947 and Anna changed her last name back to "Dodge". After Anna's last child, Horace Jr., died in 1962, she lived in seclusion at Rose Terrace until her own death in 1970.

After her death, the furnishings of the Music Room were willed to the Detroit Institute of Arts. The remaining contents were auctioned by Christie's in 1971. A catalog of Anna Thomson Dodge's bequests published in 1996 includes works of art given by her or acquired from her estate from 1925 to 1973, as well as artwork purchased with the Mr and Mrs Horace E. Dodge Memorial Fund from 1971 to 1995. In the year 2000, the Detroit Institute of Arts de-accessioned a number of works of art made specifically for the Music Room at Rose Terrace (many by Alavoine et Cie) on commission from Joseph Duveen, which were sold at Christie's in New York on May 24, namely the Aubusson carpet, the four bronze and crystal chandeliers by Baguès Fréres, the four display cabinets that had held Anna Dodge's collection of Sèvres, and the copy of a pair of Jardinières ensuite with a pair of late eighteenth century Athéniennes still in the bequest (Lots 316–321).

For the next few years, the mansion was used by local organizations for fundraisers and meetings. However, its upkeep was prohibitively expensive, and there were no buyers who wanted to keep and maintain it. The mansion was eventually sold to a developer, and despite efforts to preserve the edifice for its historical significance, it was demolished in the summer of 1976.

== Description ==
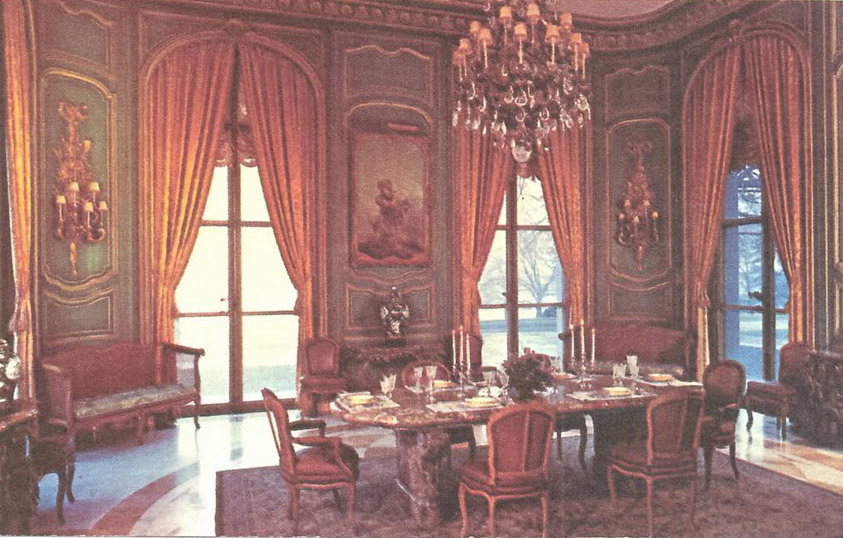
Interior c 1971

Trumbauer's design for Rose Terrace emerged as an enlarged version of Miramar, his 1911 design for George Dunton Widener. The house was a French-style Louis XV chateau overlooking Lake St. Clair, and was approached from Jefferson via a long circular drive. It was constructed from brick walls on a concrete foundation, and surfaced with Indiana limestone. The mansard roof was sheathed with copper.

The main floor contained numerous reception rooms, a formal dining room, a library, a breakfast room, two sitting rooms, a music room/ballroom, a card room, a bar, and a kitchen pantry. All rooms had 18.5 feet (5.6 m) ceilings. The music room, a favorite of Anna Dodge's, measured 60 feet (18 m) by 36 feet (11 m), and contained an organ purchased by Horace Dodge for the original Rose Terrace. A marble staircase and an elevator connected the first and second floors. Half of the second floor was used as Mrs. Dodge's private suite. She and her husband Hugh shared a sitting room and office, but each had separate bedrooms, dressing rooms and bathrooms. The other half held another second office and sitting room, and well as eight guest rooms with baths.

The attic held the servant's quarters, including an apartment for the housekeeper, a valet's room, twelve maids' rooms, and six rooms for male servants. The basement of the house held the kitchen, the servants' dining room, an ice cream parlor, a flower room, a wine cellar, a gymnasium and storage vaults for furs, rugs, and silver.

When completed and furnished, the mansion contained over 42,000 square feet (3,900 m^{2}), had 75 rooms, (including 42 main rooms), 15 fireplaces, 40 French doors, 37 sofas, and more than 100 tables. Many of the furnishings had a notable provenance, including a bureau made for Catherine the Great, four chairs that had belonged to Marie Antoinette, a piano once used by the children of George III, a jewel casket that had belonged to Russian Empress Maria Feodorovna, and a rosewood writing table made by Jean Henri Riesener.
