= Anna Thompson Dodge =

Art collector, philanthropist, and automotive heiress

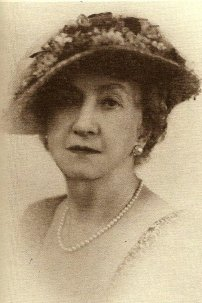
Anna Thompson Dodge, circa 1910–1920

Anna Thompson Dodge (7 August 1866 – 2 June 1970) was a Scottish-American socialite and philanthropist, one of the richest women in the world at the time of her death.

== Life and family ==
She was born on 7 August 1866 in Dundee, Scotland, as Anna Thompson. Her obituary in The New York Times lists her age as 103. Her parents were William Thompson and Elizabeth Stevens. In 1896, she married Horace Elgin Dodge Sr., of Dodge Brothers Company. The couple had a son, Horace Elgin Dodge Jr., and a daughter, Delphine Dodge.

After her husband died (only 11 months after his brother and Dodge-cofounder John Francis Dodge), she became a substantial owner of the Dodge company. She and John's widow Matilda sold the company in 1926 for US$146 million (equivalent to $2.66 billion in 2025) to Dillon, Read & Co., which was the largest cash transaction in history at the time.

On 8 May 1926, she married actor Hugh Dillman, who had previously been married to Marjorie Rambeau. She divorced Dillman in 1947. Her English home was St Leonard's at Clewer, near Windsor, in Berkshire.

She gave the City of Detroit $1,000,000 towards the construction of a fountain in memory of her late husband and son. The Horace E. Dodge and Son Memorial Fountain was designed by Isamu Noguchi in 1978, and it is located near the center of Philip A. Hart Plaza.

She died on 2 June 1970 at her home having outlived both of her children, Rose Terrace, in Grosse Pointe Farms, Michigan, at the age of 103. She had been a wheelchair user for the previous seven years.
