= Frances Dodge =

American businesswoman

- Born: November 27, 1914; Detroit, Michigan, U.S.
- Died: January 24, 1971 (aged 56); Boca Raton, Florida, U.S.
- Occupation: Racehorse owner/breeder
- Spouse(s): James Johnson (m. 1938; div. 1948) Frederick Van Lennep (m. 1949)
- Parent(s): John Francis Dodge; Matilda Dodge Wilson

Frances Dodge (November 27, 1914 – January 24, 1971) was an American horsewoman and racehorse owner. She was the daughter of John Francis Dodge, co-founder of Dodge Motor Company.

== Biography ==
She was the eldest of the three children of John Francis Dodge (co-founder of Dodge Motor Company) and his third wife Matilda Rausch Dodge (Wilson). The Dodges had three other children and lived their early years in Detroit and Grosse Pointe. In 1920, after the death of John Dodge, the family moved to Meadow Brook Farms in Rochester, Michigan, which had been a hunting and golf retreat for the Dodge brothers. She was encouraged to ride along with her brother, Daniel, and this sparked a lifelong passion for horses. Frances finished high school at Mt. Vernon Seminary (Now the George Washington University) in 1933 and married James Johnson on July 1, 1938. The next year, on her 25th birthday, Frances received control of her $10,000,000 trust fund from the John Dodge estate).

Frances founded Dodge Stables at Meadow Brook Farm where she bred American Saddlebreds. Under the management of Wallace Bailey, and later, Earl Teater, Dodge Stables became notable in the show horse world. She and Jimmy Johnson's breeding program produced a string of champions including Wing Commander, a five-gaited horse who became highly notable in the show horse world.

In 1945, she and her husband bought Castleton Farm in Lexington, Kentucky, a former Thoroughbred breeding and stud farm. As her older half-sister, Isabel who owned Brookmeade Stable, Frances Dodge also became interested in horse racing and breeding. Castleton was to become a Standardbred breeding farm as successful as any worldwide. Together, the Johnsons won the Hambletonian Stakes in 1948 with homebred Hoot Mon, and again with Victory Song. Their red chestnut pacing star, Ensign Hanover, won the Little Brown Jug in 1949. It is believed that Ensign Hanover is the first horse to have ever flown in an airplane, when he flew, crosstied in the aisle of a DC-3 cargo plane from Indiana to New York where he won a stake race at Roosevelt Raceway (the idea was put forth by famed aviator Wiley Post). On September 27, 1940, Mrs. Johnson set the record for trotting under saddle, riding Greyhound, completing a mile in 2:01.3/4 at Lexington, Kentucky's famous Red Mile. This record stood for 54 years until broken by Moni Maker, a trotter bred by Mrs. van Lennep's daughter, Fredericka Caldwell.

Divorced from her first husband in 1948, she married Frederick Van Lennep in 1949. That same year, Dodge Stables was moved to Castleton Farm.

Frances Dodge continued to support harness racing and was considered one of the women pioneers in the sport.

In 1972, she was elected to the World Championship Horse Show Hall of Fame, along with her horse Wing Commander, and trainer Earl Teater.

The Van Lennep Memorial Achievement Award is given to recognize extraordinary contribution by an individual or organization in the Standardbred industry. Though named for Frederick Van Lennep, Mr. Van Lennep credited his wife for much of the success of Castleton Farm.
