= SS Delphine =

A number of steamships have been named Delphine, including:

- SS Delphine (1914)
- SS Delphine (1921)
