= Frederick Van Lennep =

American advertising and harness racing executive (1911–1987)

- Born: Frederick Leas Van Lennep; July 6, 1911; Philadelphia, Pennsylvania, U.S.
- Died: June 16, 1987 (aged 75); Lexington, Kentucky, U.S.
- Resting place: Lexington Cemetery
- Education: Princeton University
- Occupation: Advertising executive
- Known for: Castleton Farm; Pompano Park
- Spouse: Frances Dodge (m. 1949)
- Honors: United States Harness Racing Hall of Fame (1975)

Frederick Van Lennep (June 16, 1911 – June 16, 1987) was an American advertising executive and harness racing figure who founded Pompano Park.

== Early life and education ==
Born Frederick Leas Van Lennep in 1911 in Philadelphia, Pennsylvania, he belonged to a Philadelphia Main Line family. He was the son of Dr. Gustave Van Lennep of Ardmore. His father was a prominent Philadelphia surgeon.

He attended Phillips Exeter Academy and graduated from Princeton University in 1933.

== Career ==
The Philadelphia native established himself as an advertising executive at Newsweek in New York. He retired from his position with the magazine in March 1949.

=== Castleton Farm ===
He first became interested in harness horses shortly before entering the United States Navy during World War II after a friend introduced him to them. The interest developed further after the war and became prominent around his second marriage. His association with the sport of harness racing began in 1949, when he married Frances Dodge, owner of Castleton Farm and the heiress of Dodge Motor Company. His new wife, the daughter of John Francis Dodge, was a prominent horsewoman who spent much of her time raising horses on her 1,100-acre farm in Lexington. He and Frances soon began their expansion program of Castleton Farm as a breeding and racing establishment. Under the leadership of the Van Lenneps, Castleton Farm produced a number of renowned horses. The operation eventually became part of a private corporation that included other farms in Ohio, Florida, New Jersey, and New York. F. L. Van Lennep served as the president of Castleton Inc. He developed it into the second-largest breeder of standardbred horses in the world.

=== Lexington Trots Breeders Association ===
He became a director of the Lexington Trots Breeders Association in October 1949, the organization responsible for the annual Lexington Trots. He had been appointed as an executive committee member in the early 1950s. In 1955, Van Lennep presided over a group acquisition of Tattersalls Arena, which conducted yearling sales of leading standardbred breeders. By 1956, he was named president of the Lexington Trots Breeders Association, then the parent organization of the Red Mile trotting track and Tattersalls Corp. He was later elected as treasurer in 1960.

Van Lennep was appointed on June 15, 1950, by Kentucky Governor Earle C. Clements to serve on a commission established to regulate harness racing in Kentucky. His service concluded in 1952 during the administration of Gov. Lawrence Wetherby.

=== Racing executive ===
==== Wolverine Raceway ====
The head of Castleton Industries purchased Wolverine Harness Raceway Inc. and stock in the Michigan Racing Association in June 1952 for $880,000. After years operating Wolverine Raceway at the Detroit Race Course, he led an investment group that purchased the track in 1969.

==== Pompano Park ====
In 1952, he spotted an abandoned 1920s-era thoroughbred racetrack while flying over Pompano Beach, Florida. He acquired 150 acres of land in Pompano Beach to use as a winter training ground for the harness horses from Castleton Farm. After purchasing the property in 1953, he went to the Florida Legislature in 1955 to apply for a harness racing license. For many years, the track owner battled the state legislature to allow legalized wagering at the facility. He pushed in 1961 for a bill to transfer a St. Augustine harness racing license, which passed over Gov. Farris Bryant's veto before being ruled unconstitutional by the Supreme Court of Florida in 1963. Van Lennep purchased the Key West Dog Track in 1963 and sought to convert the dog racing license into a harness racing permit. The legislature authorized transfer of the parimutuel license to his Broward County track. He built a half-mile training track and stable area, and after twelve years and $15 million, opened Pompano Park on February 4, 1964. He remained as the board's chairman throughout his later years.

At the time Pompano Park opened, Van Lennep, president of Wolverine Harness Raceway, also balanced the success of Speedy Scot with director positions in the United States Trotting Association, the Hambletonian Society, the Grand Circuit, and Tattersalls Sales.

He purchased the Hollywood Kennel Club (now Big Easy Casino) for around $8 million in December 1965. By 1968, he held the controlling interest in three harness racing plants and a single dog track.

Van Lennep took part in forming the American Horse Council in 1969 and served as treasurer. He was involved in efforts to win tax breaks for horsemen and led the push for pre-race drug testing of horses.

He was appointed by Gov. Julian Carroll as chairman of the 17-member board of the Kentucky Horse Park, formed by the 1979 General Assembly to manage its operation.

In the early 1980s, he helped develop the concept of the Breeders Crown, a year-end championship series by the Hambletonian Society. With John Gaines, he also conceived a similar model for thoroughbred racing, leading to the Breeders' Cup.

He was instrumental in forming the McDowell Cancer Foundation, serving as vice chairman, and contributed to the founding of the Lucille Parker Markey Cancer Center in 1982. Van Lennep also played a key role in the 1985 establishment of the Maxwell H. Gluck Equine Research Center at the University of Kentucky and was on its executive board.

He sold his major holdings at Pompano Park and Wolverine Raceway in the mid-1980s. At the time of his death, he was still the largest stockholder in the Red Mile racetrack in Lexington.

== Personal life ==
Van Lennep was a member of the Merion Cricket Club, the Everglades Club, and the Bloomfield Hills Country Club.

His first marriage was on April 3, 1933, to Celeste McNeal, a skilled equestrienne and daughter of J. Hector McNeal, owner of Woodmont. The two divorced in 1947. At age 37, he married 35-year-old Frances Dodge Johnson at her Lexington estate on January 22, 1949. He and Frances had two children, Fredericka and John Francis Van Lennep. After his second wife died in 1971, she left her estate, including the family fortune, to him. A dispute followed when he failed to distribute the estate to the children for six years. When they threatened legal action over the inheritance, each received a $1 million trust fund paying $200,000 annually. The widowed Van Lennep married Mary Hazen Sprow in 1971.

== Death ==
Van Lennep died on June 16, 1987, in Lexington, Kentucky, United States, at 76. He died from esophageal cancer at the University of Kentucky's Lucille Parker Markey Cancer Center. He is buried in Lexington Cemetery in Lexington, Kentucky.

== Legacy ==
He was elected to the Living Hall of Fame at the Hall of Fame of the Trotter in 1974. Formally inducted on July 6, 1975, he became the sixth person inducted into the Harness Racing Hall of Fame without ever sitting in a sulky. He was named Outstanding Horseman by the Kentucky Harness Racing Commission in 1981.

The Hambletonian Society established the Frederick L. Van Lennep Memorial Award in 1987.

At Kentucky Horse Park, the Van Lennep Indoor Arena was dedicated on September 14, 1988, in recognition of his impact. Gov. Wallace Wilkinson praised his contributions to the facility's success.
