= SS Delphine (1921) =

Steam yacht

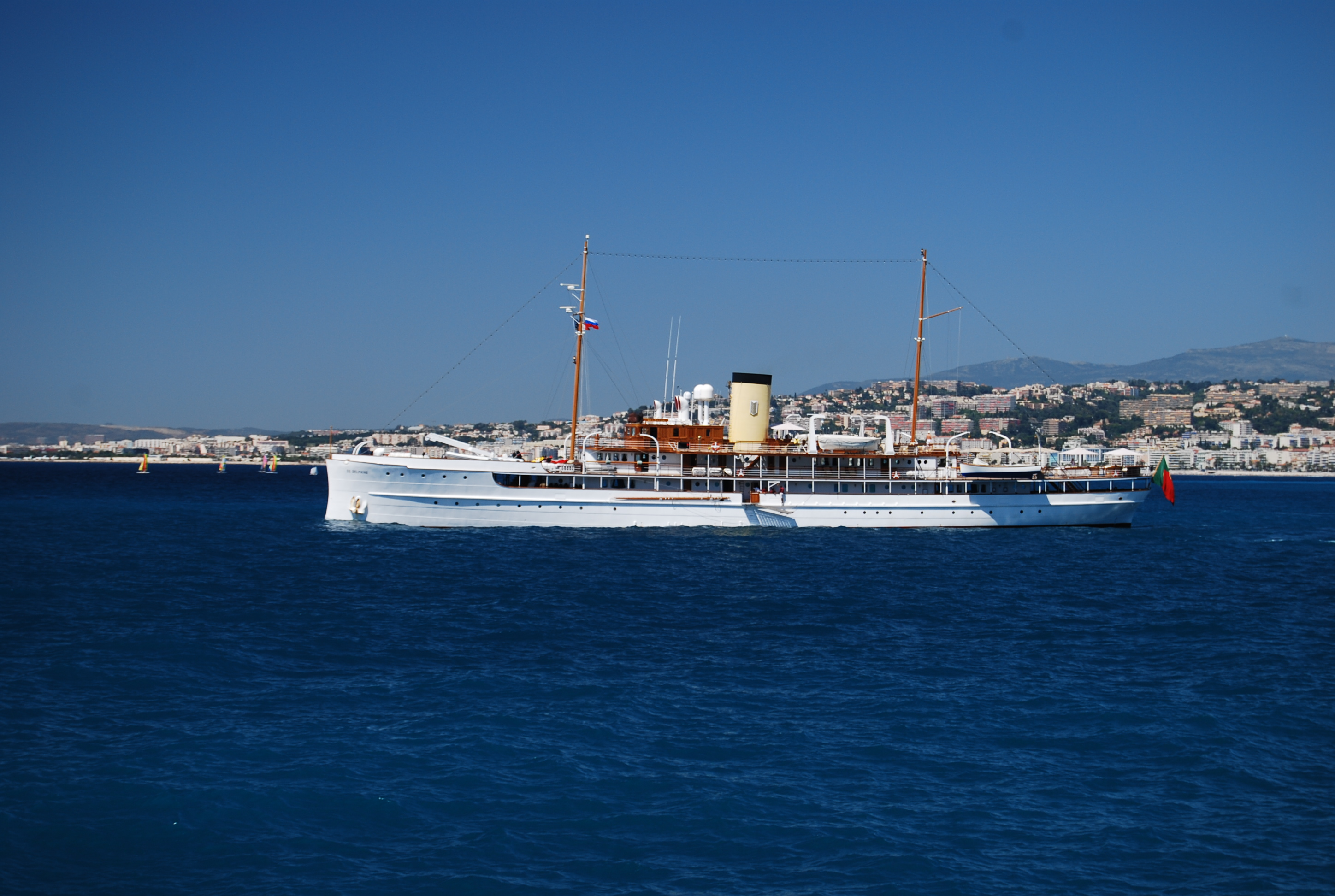
- SS Delphine off the French Riviera, July 2008.

History

United States
- Name: Delphine
- Owner: Anna Thompson Dodge
- Builder: Great Lakes Engineering Works
- Cost: $2 million (building cost in 1921)
- Launched: 2 April 1921
- Fate: Requisitioned by the US Navy 1942

United States
- Name: USS Dauntless
- Operator: United States Navy
- Acquired: 21 January 1942
- Commissioned: 11 May 1942
- Decommissioned: 11 May 1946
- Stricken: 5 June 1946
- Identification: Callsign: NBAK; Hull number: PG-61
- Fate: Transferred to the Maritime Commission for disposal, 10 June 1946; Returned to prewar owner

United States
- Name: SS Delphine
- Owner: Anna Thompson Dodge
- Acquired: 1946
- Fate: Donated in 1967

United States
- Name: SS Delphine
- Acquired: 1967
- Fate: Sold in 1968

United States
- Name: SS Dauntless
- Operator: Seafarers Harry Lundeberg School of Seamanship; (Piney Point, Maryland)
- Acquired: 1968
- Fate: Sold in 1989 to Sea Sun Cruises

France, Singapore
- Name: SS Dauntless
- Operator: Sea Sun Cruises
- Acquired: 1989
- Out of service: 1997
- Fate: Sold in 1997

Monaco
- Name: SS Delphine
- Owner: Jacques Bruynooghe
- Port of registry: Madeira, Portugal
- Christened: 10 September 2003
- Acquired: 1997
- Refit: 1998–2003
- Home port: Monaco
- Identification: Callsign: CQTJ; IMO number: 8971815; MMSI number: 255986000

General characteristics (SS Delphine)
- Type: Steam yacht
- Tonnage: 1342 t (gross)
- Length: 257.8 ft (78.6 m)
- Beam: 35.5 ft (10.8 m)
- Draft: 14.6 ft (4.5 m)
- Installed power: Original: 3 × 250 psi Babcock & Wilcox steam boilers; 2003 Refit: 2 × 290 psi Water-tube boilers
- Propulsion: 2 × 1,500 ihp (1,100 kW) quadruple-expansion engines; 2 shafts; 2 propellers
- Speed: Max 12 kn (22 km/h; 14 mph)
- Capacity: 26 passengers
- Crew: 24–30

SS Delphine is a steam yacht launched in 1921. During the Second World War, the yacht was used by the US Navy, as the gunboat USS Dauntless (PG-61).

== Design ==
Power was originally supplied from three Babcock & Wilcox boilers powering two 1,500-horsepower (1,100 kW) quadruple-expansion engines.

In her 2003 refit Delphine was re-equipped with two modern water-tube boilers operating at 20 bars (290 psi), the larger of which has an evaporation capacity of 14 metric tons (31,000 lb) of steam per hour while the smaller can evaporate 4 metric tons (8,800 lb) per hour; these new boilers supply the original quadruple-expansion engines. "Of all the large American-built steam yachts built between 1893 and 1930, the Delphine is the only one left in her original condition with her original steam engines still in service."

== History ==
=== Early career ===
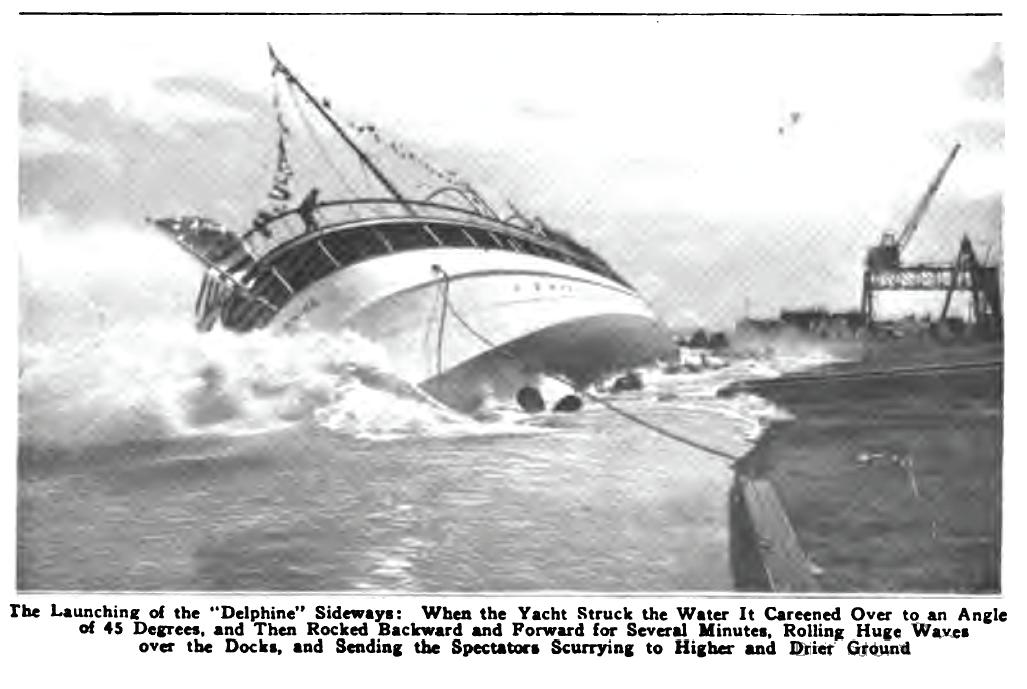
SS Delphine launched April 1921. Caption from Popular Mechanics magazine

The Delphine was commissioned by Horace E. Dodge, co-founder of Dodge Brothers (though he never saw her complete, having died from the Spanish flu in 1920). The yacht was launched on 2 April 1921, captained by Arthur A. Archer.

The Delphine caught fire and sank in New York in 1926, and was recovered after four months, restored and remodeled for $750,000. By 1935, she was docked for an extended period at her private pier on Lake St. Clair. She suffered further damage in 1940 when she ran aground in the Great Lakes, and was repaired.

=== As gunboat USS Dauntless ===
The Delphine was acquired by the US Navy in January 1942, refitted as a gunboat with a wartime paint scheme, a pair of 3-inch guns, six .50 cal machine guns, and a Marine detachment. She was commissioned five months later, rechristened as the USS Dauntless (PG-61), with Cdr. Charles F. Grisham in command. She was to serve as the flagship for Admiral Ernest King, Commander in Chief of the U.S. Fleet and Chief of Naval Operations. She was sold back to Anna Dodge (Horace Dodge's wife) after the conclusion of World War II and restored to civilian standards and service, including her original name.

Purportedly, U.S. President Franklin D. Roosevelt used the yacht and the Yalta accords were drafted while he was on board.

=== Post war ===
Delphine was sold in 1967 and again in 1968, changing names again to Dauntless, only to be sold again in 1986, 1989, and in 1997 – at scrap metal prices to her next owner, Jacques Bruynooghe, who proceeded to restore her for $60 million to the original 1921 condition including interior decor and the original steam engines. She was rechristened Delphine by Princess Stéphanie of Monaco on 10 September 2003. In 2007, the ship was used as part of the setting for the Rian Johnson film The Brothers Bloom.
