= Castleton Lyons =

US horse-racing stable and breeding business

Coordinates: 38.1278°N 84.4737°W

Castleton Farm
- Type: Horse breeding & Racing
- Industry: Standardbreds, American Saddlebreds, Thoroughbreds
- Founded: 1793
- Headquarters: Lexington, Kentucky; United States
- Key people: Owners: John Breckinridge; Mary Ann Castleman; James R. Keene; Foxhall P. Keene; Frances Dodge Van Lennep; Tony Ryan

Castleton Lyons near Lexington, Kentucky, is an American horse-racing stable and breeding business best known by the name Castleton Farm.

== History ==
The farm was established in 1793 when Virginian John Breckinridge, a future U.S. senator and attorney general, purchased 2,467 acres (10 km^{2}) of land and on a portion of it established a Thoroughbred horse-breeding operation. On his death, the property transferred to his daughter, Mary Ann, the then Mrs. David Castleman, who eventually built a mansion on the horse-farm site and gave it the family name. Under the Castlemans, Castleton Farm continued as a Thoroughbred operation, but added the breeding of American Saddlebreds and Standardbreds for harness racing.

Development by James R. Keene

The original property changed hands several times, occasionally small parts being divvied up and sold to multiple different parties. In the early 1890s, Wall Street tycoon James R. Keene acquired the farm and purchased additional land to bring the operation to almost 1,000 acres (4 km^{2}). Keene usually referred to the farm as "Castleton Stud", and under his direction, it became one of the greatest Thoroughbred operations of its day. The farm bred and/or raced future U.S. racing Hall of Fame horses Kingston, Domino, Ben Brush, Colin, Sysonby, Maskette, and Peter Pan.

As part of a program honoring important horse racing tracks and racing stables, the Pennsylvania Railroad named its baggage car #5865 the "Castleton Farm".

Castleton Stakes
Gravesend Race Track in Brooklyn, New York created the Castleton Stakes in 1908 to honor Castleton Farm. The event was run only one time when racing in New York state was shut down due to the New York Legislature enacting the Hart-Agnew anti-betting legislation with penalties allowing for heavy fines and up to a year in prison.

Year	Winner	Age	Jockey	Trainer	Owner	Dist. (Miles)	Time	Win $
1908	Melisande	2	Joe Notter	James G. Rowe Sr.	James R. Keene	5 f	1:00.00	$2,960

Ownership transition to Foxhall Keene

Upon the death of James R. Keene in 1913, the farm was taken over by his son Foxhall P. Keene. He continued the operation on a slightly reduced basis, but sold it in the 1920s to fellow New Yorker, David Look. Look had considerable success in harness racing, but was forced to sell the farm after experiencing personal financial setbacks during the Great Depression.

Mid- to late 20th century

In the early 1940s, heiress Frances Dodge founded the Dodge Stable. She was the daughter of Michigan automobile pioneer John F. Dodge and a half-sister of Isabel Dodge, owner of the highly successful Brookmeade Stable. In 1945, Frances Dodge, with her husband (polo player and hunter/jumper rider) James B. "Jimmy" Johnson, purchased Castleton Farm and relocated her Dodge stables there. Their Standardbred breeding operation included two Hambletonian winners and a Little Brown Jug winner. After she married Pennsylvania native Frederick Van Lennep in 1949, the farm underwent major renovations to breed and raise Standardbreds. The Van Lenneps made Castleton Farm one of the pre-eminent operations in both disciplines. Under Mrs. Johnson, Dodge Stables' American Saddlebred show horse Wing Commander became a six-time world grand champion, and with her husband, she enjoyed enormous success in harness racing that included a number of Hambletonian and Little Brown Jug victories from horses such as United States Harness Horse of the Year and Harness Racing Museum & Hall of Fame inductee Victory Song (1947), Hambletonian Stakes winners, Hoot Mon (1947), Emily's Pride (1958), and Speedy Scot (1963). Among the other noteworthy harness horses bred by Castleton Stud were Ensign Hanover, winner of the 1946 inaugural Little Brown Jug, and 1972 Jug winner Strike Out, which won in world-record time. Strike Out went on to sire 1979 winner Hot Hitter, bred by Castleton in conjunction with Anthony Tavolacci.

2000s

In 2001, Irish businessman and racing enthusiast Tony Ryan acquired Castleton Farm from the Van Lennep Family Trust. Ryan renamed it Castleton Lyons after his Irish estate Lyons Demesne, and undertook renovations to the property while returning to its original roots as a Thoroughbred operation.

== Gravesite ==
The Castleton Farm Cemetery lies at an "intersection of two of the tree-lined farm roads, and is an open green space flanked on one end by a 12-ft-high, horseshoe-shaped hedge." It is not only the final resting spot of a number of Standardbred and Saddlebred mares and stallions, including Wing Commander, but also, in unmarked graves, of the Thoroughbred stallions Commando (circa 1898–1905) and Kingston (circa 1884–1912).
