= Elliott Tower =

Building

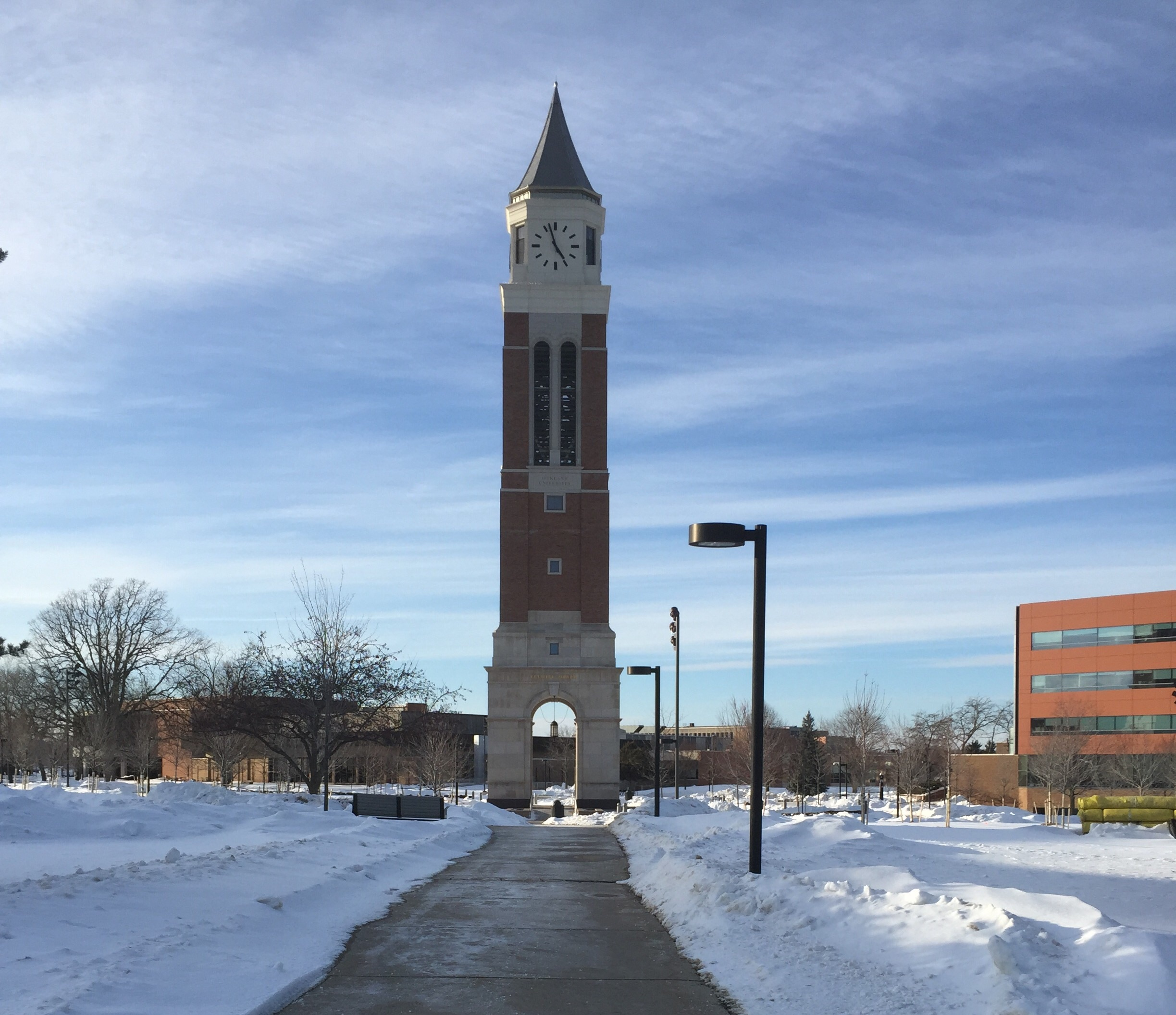
- Interactive map of the Elliott Tower area

General information
- Type: Carillon
- Location: Auburn Hills, Michigan (Between the Oakland Center, Kresge Library, and O'Dowd Hall)
- Coordinates: 42°40′25″N 83°12′57″W
- Named for: Hugh and Nancy Elliott
- Completed: 2014
- Owner: Oakland University

Dimensions
- Other dimensions: 49 bells in the carillon

Design and construction
- Architect: Niagara Murano

Website
- Elliott Tower

Elliott Tower is a carillon tower on the campus of Oakland University in Auburn Hills, Michigan, United States, completed in 2014.

== Description ==
In late 2012, Hugh and Nancy Elliott, longtime donors to Oakland University after whom the school's Business and Informational Technology building is named, made another donation to the university to be used for the construction of a carillon tower.

Groundbreaking occurred on April 19, 2013, with the dedication ceremony held on September 19, 2014. The 151-foot tower was planned to be the main campus's centerpiece. A water fountain, a garden, and decorative landscaping have been added at the tower's base.

== Summer Carillon Concert Series ==
Beginning in 2015, Oakland University established the tradition of carillon recitals occurring on six Fridays during the summer. The inaugural series included recitals by Olesya Rostovskaya, among others.
