= Horace Elgin Dodge =

American businessman (1868–1920)

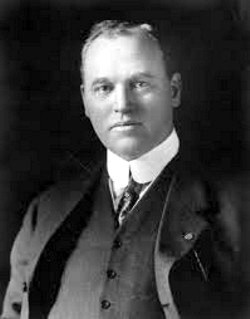
- Born: May 17, 1868; Niles, Michigan, U.S.
- Died: December 10, 1920 (aged 52); Palm Beach, Florida, U.S.
- Resting place: Woodlawn Cemetery, Detroit
- Known for: Founding Dodge Brothers Company which became present-day Dodge
- Spouse: Anna Thompson Dodge
- Children: 2
- Relatives: John Francis Dodge (brother)

Horace Elgin Dodge Sr. (May 17, 1868 – December 10, 1920) was an American automobile manufacturing pioneer and co-founder of Dodge Brothers Company.

== Early years and business ==
He was born in Niles, Michigan, on May 17, 1868. His father owned a foundry and machine shop. Horace Dodge and his elder brother John Francis Dodge were inseparable as children and as adults. The pair was noted for personal initiative and once built a working high-wheel bicycle from scrap materials.

In 1886, the Dodge brothers moved to Detroit, Michigan, where they took jobs at Murphy Boiler Works, a boilermaker plant owned by a marine engineer named Thomas Murphy. In 1894, they went to work as machinists at the Canadian Typograph Company across the Detroit River in Windsor, Ontario.

In 1896, Horace Dodge married Anna Thompson in Windsor, Ohio. She was a Scottish immigrant born in Dundee and came from a working class family. The couple had a son, Horace Jr., and a daughter, Delphine. Thompson later married actor Hugh Dillman after the death of Dodge.

While brother John Dodge was the sales-oriented managerial type, Horace was a gifted mechanic and inveterate tinkerer. He invented the first dirt-proof ball bearing. In 1897, John arranged a deal for them to join with a third-party investor to manufacture bicycles. Within a few years, they sold the business and, in 1901, used the proceeds of the sale to set up their own machine shop in Detroit. During their first year in business, the Dodge brothers' company began making parts for the automobile industry. This company secured a contract to produce transmissions for Oldsmobile and for the newly chartered Ford Motor Company.

== Automobiles ==
In 1902, they won a contract to build transmissions for the Olds Motor Vehicle Company upon which they built a solid reputation for quality and service. However, the following year they turned down a second contract from Olds (Oldsmobile) to retool their plant to build engines for Henry Ford in a deal that included a share position in the new Ford Motor Company. They had invested in Ford's business and eventually Ford would be in debt to the Dodge Brothers. By 1910, Horace Dodge and his brother were so successful they built a new plant in Hamtramck, Michigan.

For ten years, the Dodge brothers' company was supplier to Ford, and John Dodge worked as vice president of the Ford company. In 1913 the Dodge brothers terminated their Ford contract and devoted their energies toward producing a Dodge automobile. They introduced the Dodge Brothers 30 in November, 1914. They began building motor trucks, ambulances and other vehicles for the United States military during the arms buildup for World War I At war's end, their company manufactured and marketed both cars and trucks. By 1919, Ford bought back the Dodges' stock for $25 million.

He was inducted into the Automotive Hall of Fame in 1981.

== Personal life ==
Despite their wealth and growing influence in the business community, the red-haired Dodge brothers' crude manners and aggressive conduct made them socially unacceptable to most of the wealthy Detroit elite. In 1912, Horace Dodge built a red sandstone mansion in Grosse Pointe called Rose Terrace. The huge home with formal gardens and a boat dock overlooked Lake St. Clair.

This was replaced by a second Rose Terrace, constructed in the 1930s by architect Horace Trumbauer, for Mrs. Dodge and her second husband. Architectural historian W. Hawkins Ferry described the mansion as "unquestionably Grosse Pointe's most regal residence". In addition to Rose Terrace, the Dodges acquired a large winter estate in Palm Beach, Florida. Horace's wife Anna had studied music, and this fact won them acceptance by the city's social order. Horace and Anna Dodge became major benefactors of the new Detroit Symphony Orchestra and would play a key role in the construction of Orchestra Hall.

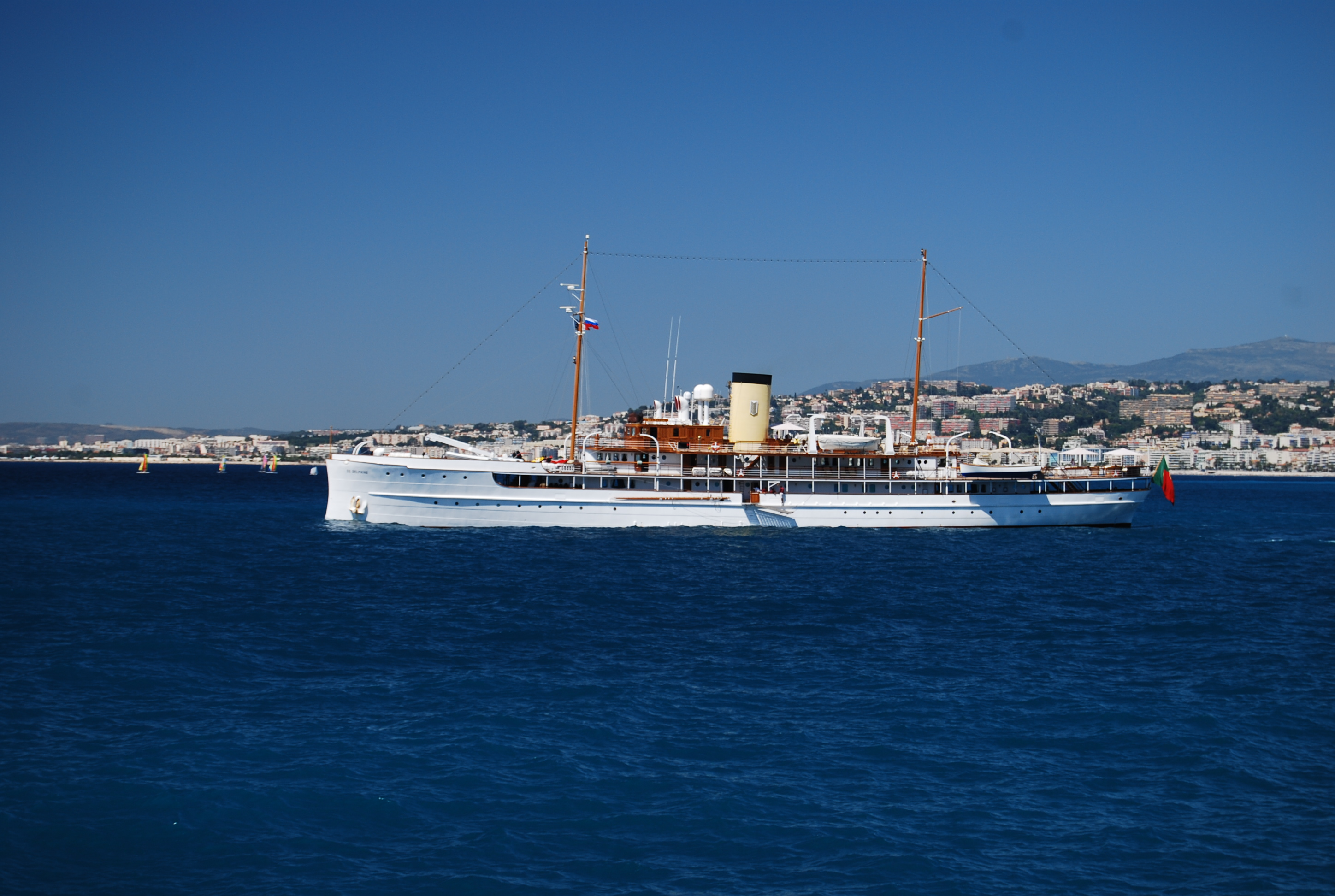
SS Delphine off the French Riviera, July 2008.

A speedboat and yachting enthusiast, Horace Dodge's keen interest in the vessel's engines led him to establish a marine division as part of their automotive business. He purchased several steam yachts, each larger and more luxurious than the previous. The first two large yachts were named Nokomis, both being purchased by the government for World War I use, with the second being described as a "floating palace" even as it was being stripped for Navy use shortly after completion. The last, named the Delphine for his daughter after following the Nokomis tradition in the early phase of design, was a 257.8-foot (78.6 m) vessel. Construction commenced in 1920 and was completed in 1921, after his death. In the ensuing years, the yacht experienced a sinking, a run onto rocks, and service as a United States Navy patrol boat during World War II. The Delphine passed through the hands of several owners and is in the final stages of restoration by its current owner (2025).

== Death ==
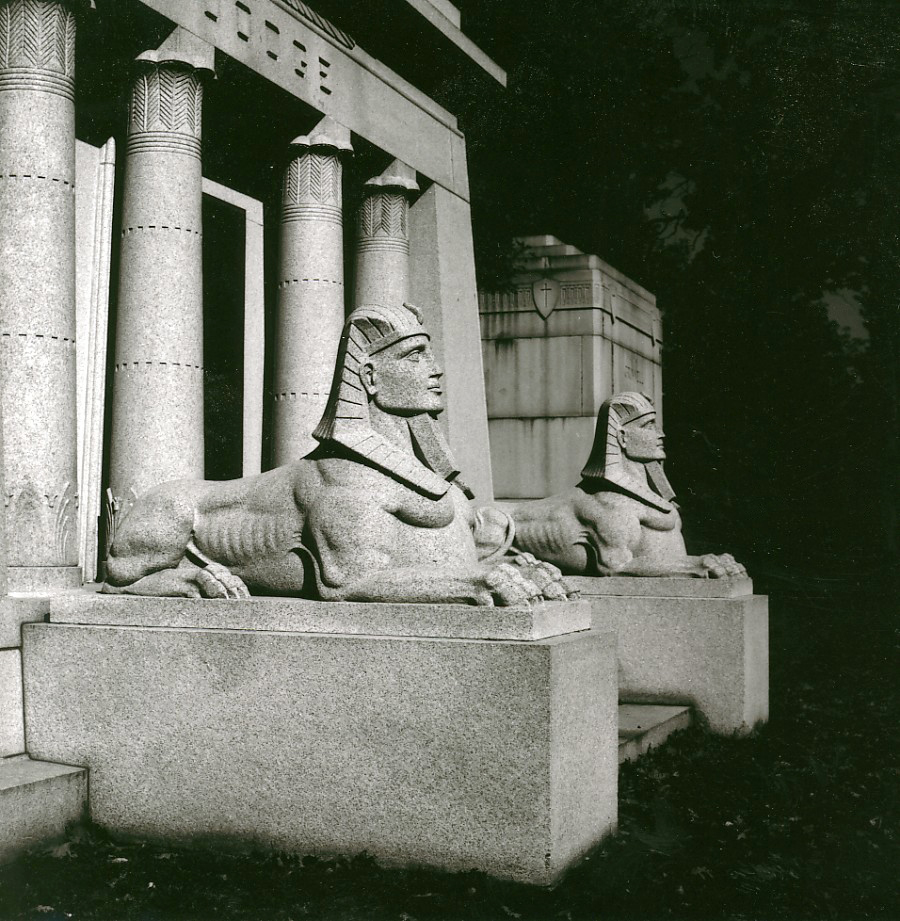
Dodge Brothers Mausoleum

In 1919, Henry Ford bought out the Dodge brothers' shareholdings in Ford Motor Company for $25 million. In January 1920, Horace's brother, John, died during the influenza epidemic. He was interred in the family's Egyptian-style mausoleum in Detroit's Woodlawn Cemetery guarded by two Sphinx statues. Having also contracted the flu that December following several relapses, Horace also died from complications of the disease resulting in pneumonia and cirrhosis of the liver at the age of 52 in Palm Beach, Florida. He was interred with his brother in the same mausoleum. His widow outlived him by fifty years.

In 1925, Horace and John Dodge's widows sold their automobile business to Dillon Read investment bankers for $146 million. Upon her death in 1970, Anna Thompson Dodge left a sum to the City of Detroit for the construction of the Horace E. Dodge and Son Memorial Fountain. The fountain was designed by sculptor Isamu Noguchi and opened in 1978 as part of the city's Hart Plaza. Horace E. Dodge Jr. died in 1963 at age 63.
