= Philip A. Hart Plaza =

City plaza in Detroit

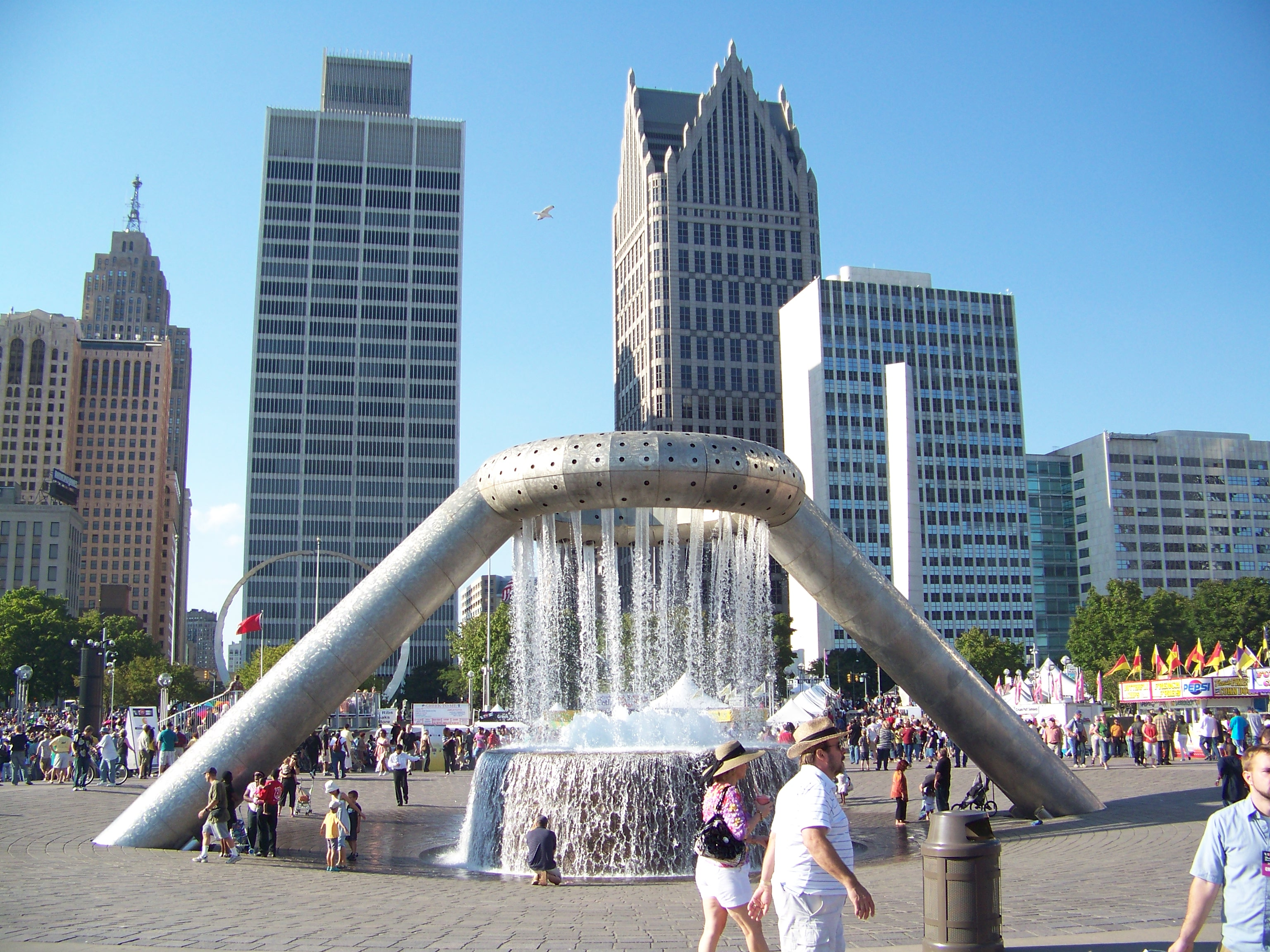
- Hart Plaza in 2009
- Interactive map of Philip A. Hart Plaza
- Type: Municipal (City of Detroit)
- Location: Detroit
- Coordinates: 42°19′39″N 83°02′40″W
- Area: 14-acre (5.7 ha)
- Created: 1975
- Operator: City of Detroit
- Open: All year
- Philip A. Hart Plaza
- U.S. National Register of Historic Places
- Location: 1 Hart Plaza; Detroit, Michigan
- Built: 1979
- Architect: Isamu Noguchi, Smith, Hinchman, and Grylls
- Architectural style: Modern
- NRHP reference No.: 100003554
- Added to NRHP: August 30, 2024
- Status: Open
- Public transit: Financial District; Congress Street; DDOT 3, 9 SMART FAST Michigan 261, Woodward 461, 462, Gratiot 561

Philip A. Hart Plaza, in downtown Detroit, is a city plaza along the Detroit River. It is located more or less on the site at which Antoine Laumet de La Mothe, sieur de Cadillac landed in 1701 when he founded Fort Pontchartrain du Détroit, the settlement that became Detroit. In 2011, the Detroit-Wayne County Port Authority opened its new cruise ship passenger terminal and dock adjacent to Hart Plaza, which receives major cruise ships such as the MS Hamburg and the Yorktown.

The 14-acre (5.7 ha) plaza, which is named for the late U.S. Senator Philip Hart, opened in 1975 and has a capacity for about 40,000 people. At the center of the plaza is the Horace E. Dodge and Son Memorial Fountain, designed by Isamu Noguchi and Walter Budd in 1978.

== History ==
The area where Hart Plaza stands today is believed to be where Antoine Laumet de La Mothe, sieur de Cadillac landed in 1701. The waterfront area became the main source of communication and transportation to the outside world until the inventions of the railroad and telegraph. By the mid-19th century this area was covered by docks, warehouses, and other industry, as was most of Detroit's waterfront of the time.

In 1890, Hazen S. Pingree, Detroit's mayor, suggested the location would be ideal for the creation of a waterfront center for city functions. However, the project was not carried out.

In 1924, the architect Eliel Saarinen was commissioned by the AIA of Michigan to compose a waterfront civic center design. Due to World War II, development did not begin until the late 1940s. The first parts to go up in the area were the buildings, including a veteran's hall, an auditorium, and the city-county building.

Hart Plaza was a departure from Saarinen's original design, which was originally to be a grassy lawn area. Instead, the current concrete plaza was built, with several built-in amphitheaters for concerts, as well as Dodge Fountain. The firm of Smith, Hinchman, and Grylls did the final design, with the help of Isamu Noguchi.

The plaza opened in 1975, and in 1976 was dedicated to Philip Hart, a United States Senator from 1959 to 1976. However, the park was not completed until 1979.

On the city's 300th birthday - July 24, 2001 - a statue was unveiled depicting Antoine Laumet de La Mothe, sieur de Cadillac's arrival at what would become Detroit in 1701.

On October 20, 2001, the Gateway to Freedom International Memorial to the Underground Railroad opened — commemorating Detroit's role in the Underground Railroad. It was sculpted by Edward Dwight, after winning a competition to design the International Memorial to the Underground Railroad.

Transcending, an arch sculpture and the Michigan Labor Legacy Landmark, was dedicated on August 30, 2003. It is located west of the entrance to Hart Plaza near the intersection of Woodward Avenue and Jefferson Avenue

In 2011, the Detroit/Wayne County Port Authority added a cruise ship dock and passenger terminal known as Port Detroit to the area between Hart Plaza and the Renaissance Center.

In 2024, Hart Plaza cohosted with the Fox Theatre the 2024 NFL draft.

== Events ==
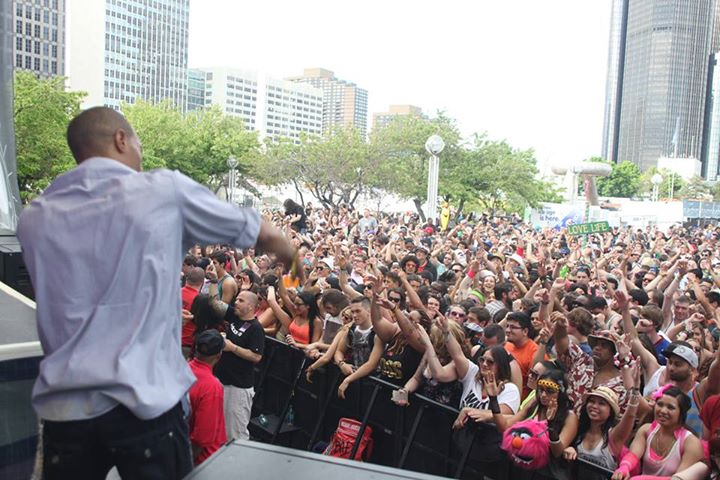
A performance by Goodmoney G100 at the Detroit Electronic Music Festival in 2015

Thousands of people from the Midwest and Canada come together during the summer for celebrations, concerts held in the plaza's two open-air amphitheaters, and festivals generally held from May through September.

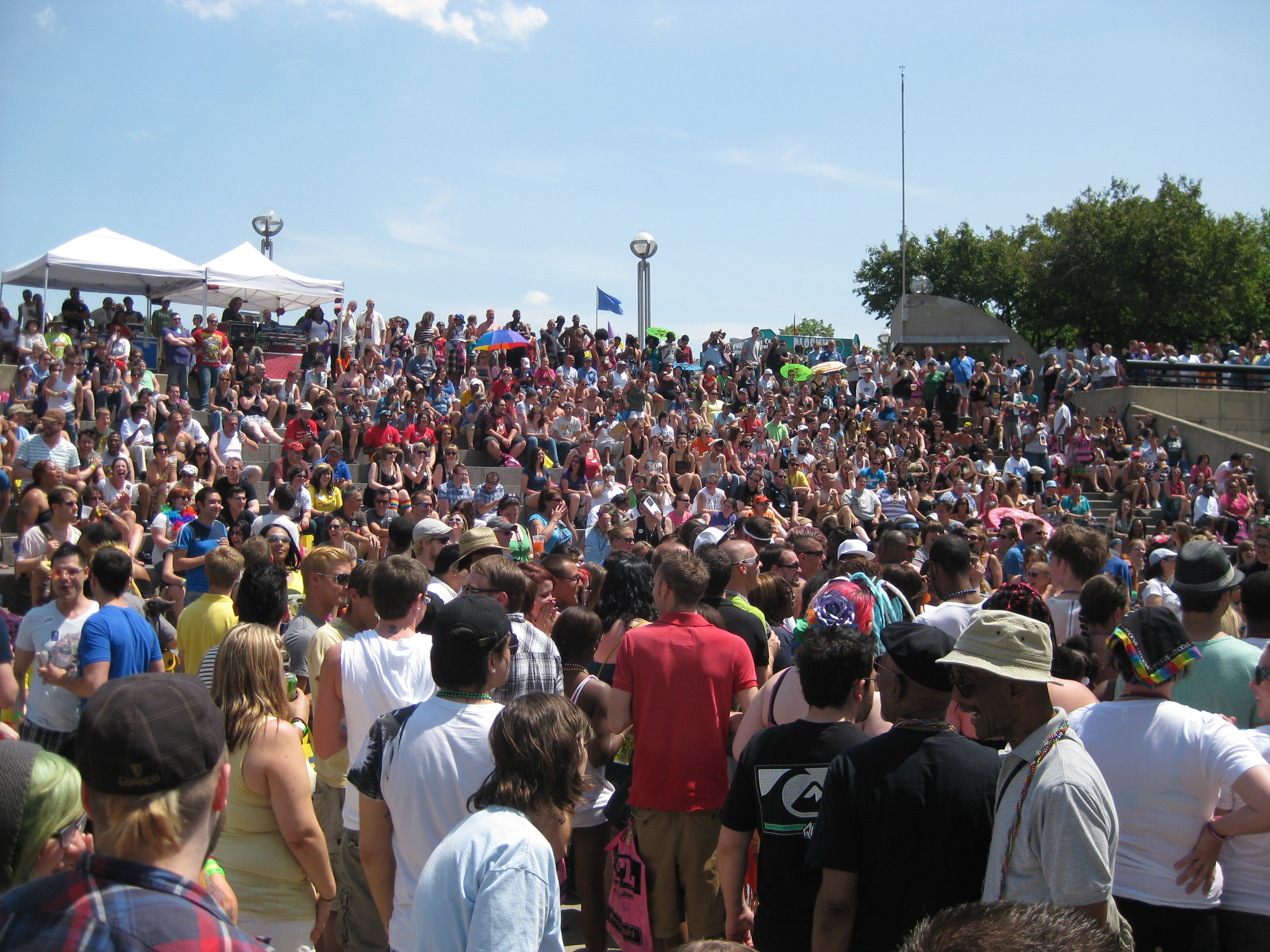
People attending a musical performance during 2011 Motor City Pride in the plaza's main outdoor amphitheater

Events held at Hart Plaza over the years include:

- African World Festival
- Arab and Chaldean Festival
- Detroit China Festival
- Detroit Electronic Music Festival (Movement)
- Detroit International Jazz Festival
- Detroit Paradise Valley Music Festival
- March for Babies
- Mega March for Animals
- Motor City Pride
- Rib's R-n-B Jazz Fest
- Rock n Roll Festival
- Windsor–Detroit International Freedom Festival

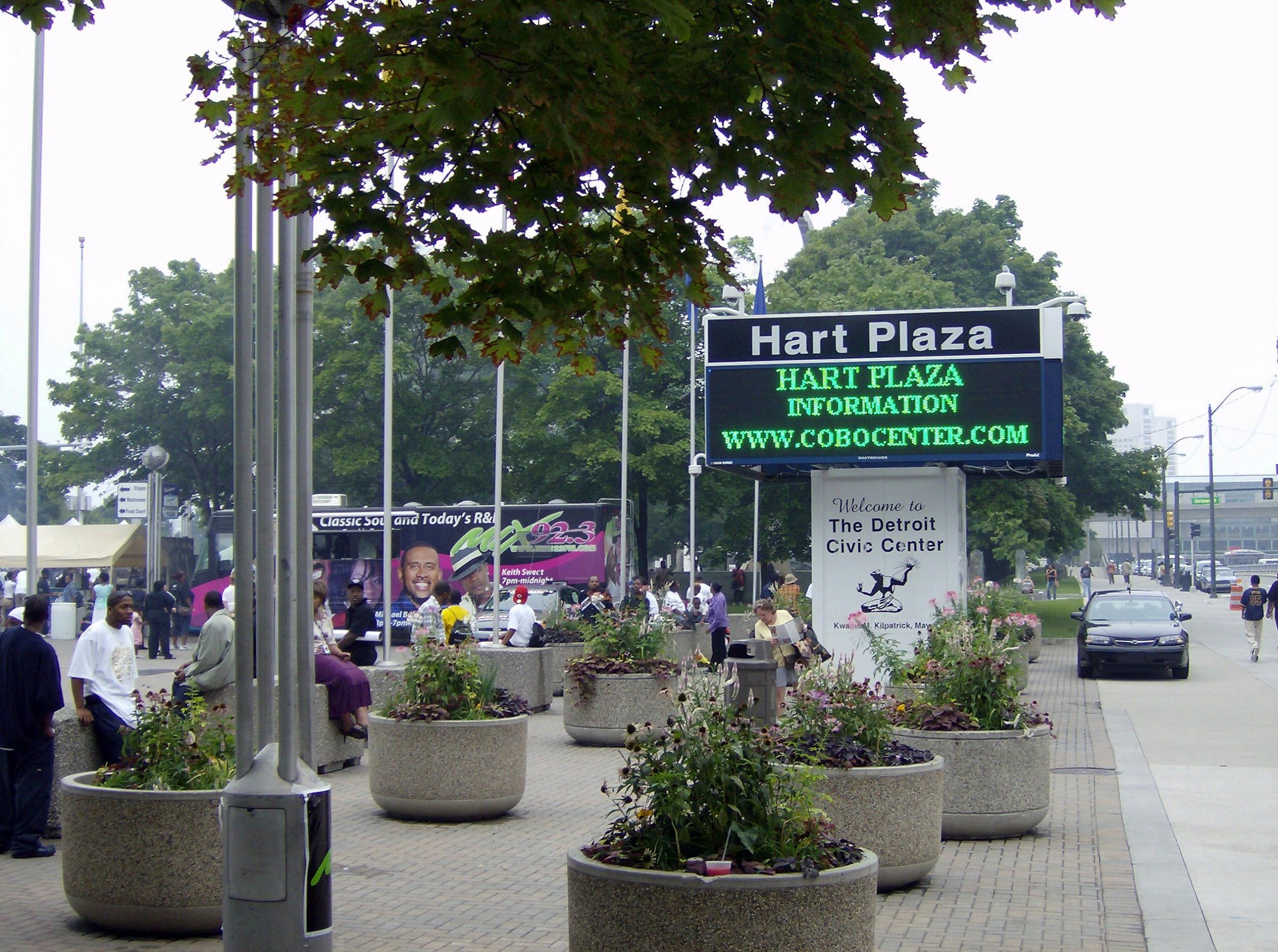
Sign and planter benches at entrance to Hart Plaza in 2007

== Surroundings ==
Hart Plaza is surrounded by many important areas and buildings of the Downtown Detroit area. It is within a few blocks of the GM Renaissance Center (RenCen), Water Square (at the former location Joe Louis Arena) and Huntington Place. In recent years, Hart Plaza has become a part of the Detroit International Riverfront.

Visitors to Hart Plaza can see across the river to Windsor, Ontario's riverfront and the Belle Isle State Park.

== Layout ==
The park is eight acres in size and is bound by the Detroit River to the south, East Jefferson Avenue to north, Bates Avenue to the east, and Civic Center Drive to the west. It consists of the upper level at the level of Jefferson Avenue, which is a supported cement slab faced in carnelian granite and concrete, and suspended above the lower level at the level of Atwater Street. The plaza was designed by Detroit-based architects Smith, Hinchman & Grylls in consultation with Japanese American architect Isamu Noguchi.

The plaza's main entrance is located at the foot of Woodward Avenue, south of the Monument to Joe Louis. At the entrance is the Pylon, a stainless steel spire sculpture designed by Isamu Noguchi. Located west of the entrance is the Michigan Labor Legacy Landmark, whose centerpiece is a 63-foot tall steel arch sculpture by David Barr and Sergio de Giusti titled Transcending. Near the center of the courtyard is the focal point of Hart Plaza, the Horace E. Dodge and Son Memorial Fountain, also designed by Isamu Noguchi. The lower level of Hart Plaza includes an open-air amphitheater near the center of the courtyard, dressing rooms, food preparation areas with kitchen service food court, three sets of public rest rooms, permanent beverage booths, temporary storage areas, offices, Detroit Police Department post at the southeast corner of the plaza, art gallery, and loading dock.

== Memorials and sculptures ==
=== Antoine de la Mothe Cadillac statue ===
Antoine Laumet de La Mothe, sieur de Cadillac — the founder of Detroit — is shown in this sculpture depicting the moment he arrived at that spot in 1701. The sculpture was a gift to the City of Detroit from the French-American Chamber of Commerce, Michigan Chapter and was unveiled on the city's 300th birthday — July 24, 2001. The bronze statue was designed by William Kieffer and Ann Feeley in 2001.

=== Gateway to Freedom International Memorial to the Underground Railroad ===
Located on the riverfront of Hart Plaza, the Gateway to Freedom International Memorial to the Underground Railroad commemorates Detroit's role in the Underground Railroad. It was sculpted by Edward Dwight, after winning a competition to design the International Memorial to the Underground Railroad, and dedicated on October 20, 2001. The project was a collaboration between Detroit 300 and the International Underground Railroad Monument Collaborative. The companion monument by the same sculptor, Tower of Freedom, is located in Windsor, Ontario's Civic Esplanade, on Pitt Street East near Caesars Windsor, and features a former slave raising his arms to celebrate his emancipation while a Quaker woman offers assistance to a woman and her child as another child looks back toward Detroit.

Until Emancipation, Detroit and the Detroit River community served as the gateway to freedom for thousands of African American people escaping enslavement. Detroit was one of the largest terminals of the Underground Railroad, a network of abolitionists aiding enslaved people seeking freedom. Detroit's Underground Railroad code name was Midnight. At first, Michigan was a destination for freedom seekers, but Canada became a safer sanctuary after slavery was abolished there in 1834. With passage of the Fugitive Slave Act in 1850, many runaways left their homes in Detroit and crossed the river to Canada to remain free. Some returned after Emancipation in 1863.

The successful operation of Detroit's Underground Railroad was due to the effort and cooperation of diverse groups of people, including people of African descent, Whites, and North American Indians. This legacy of freedom is a vital part of Detroit and its history.

— Inscription on Gateway to Freedom International Memorial to the Underground Railroad's plaque

Several routes of the Underground Railroad went through Michigan. Detroit's terminal, whose code name was Midnight, was one of the largest terminals of the Underground Railroad. At first, Michigan was a destination for freedom seekers, and by the mid-1830s, there was a modest population of former slaves living there who aided other former slaves to escape to freedom. However, Canada became a safer sanctuary after slavery was abolished there in 1834. With passage of the Fugitive Slave Act in 1850, many runaways left their homes in Detroit and crossed the river to Canada to remain free. Some returned after Emancipation in 1863. This statue commemorates the route through Detroit. Another crossing point was south of Detroit near where Amherstburg, Ontario is located.

The memorial features two gateway pillars that bracket a 10 feet (3.0 m) by 12 feet (3.7 m) sculpture showing six fugitive slaves ready to board a boat to cross to Canada. The gentleman pointing from Detroit to Windsor is George DeBaptist, a Detroit resident who helped slaves to get across the river to freedom. The monument's plaque mentions several Detroit institutions that were active in the Underground Railroad and continue to serve the city's population in the twenty-first century.

In October 2011, for the ten year anniversary of the dedication, the Downtown Development Authority spent $30,000 cleaning the monument and repairing several fixtures and the area around the monument. The Wayne County Commission and Detroit City Council passed resolutions testimonial resolutions commemorating the anniversary and recognizing the sculptor, Edward Dwight, who at 78 was on-hand to receive them. Representative John Conyers Jr. introduced a resolution to the United States Congress celebrating the 10-year commemoration of the sculpture, but it did not get past committee referrals. A three-day conference, "Celebrating the River at Midnight -The Fluid Frontier: Slavery, War, Freedom, and the Underground Railroad", was also held to commemorate the anniversary.

=== Horace E. Dodge and Son Memorial Fountain ===
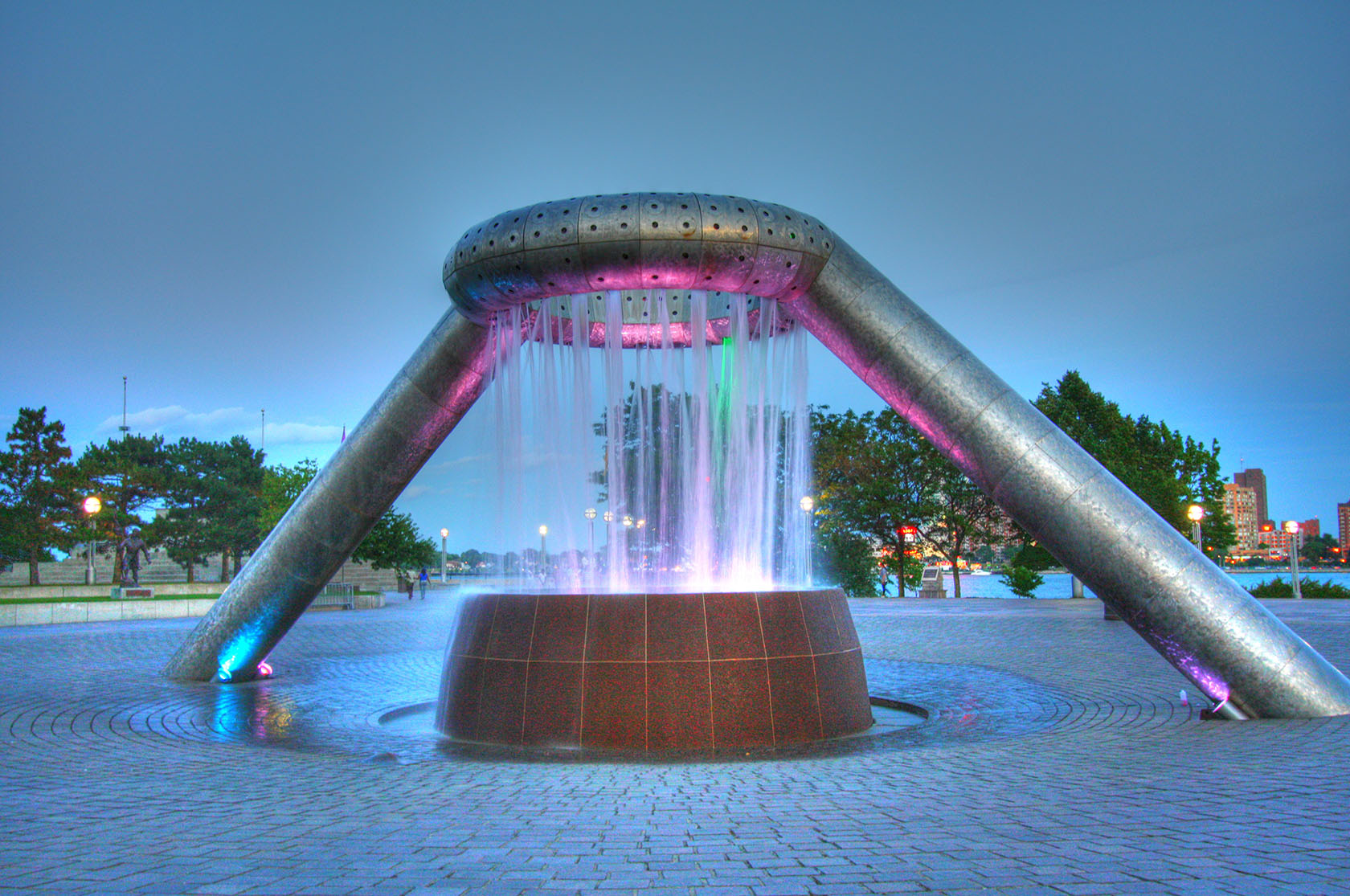
View of the Horace E. Dodge and Son Memorial Fountain

Located at the center of Hart Plaza, the Horace E. Dodge and Son Memorial Fountain was designed by Isamu Noguchi in 1978 and built in 1981. Anna Thompson Dodge gave the City of Detroit $1 million towards the construction of a fountain in memory of her late husband and son. The stainless steel fountain is composed of two legs topped by a ring to the height of 30 feet above a circular, black granite pool. The fountain contains 300 jets and 300 lights and has intricate and computerized lighting and nozzle functions, which can create different configurations, dependent on temperature.

The Dodge fountain was inoperable from January 2013 to late August 2013 after vandals did more than $1 million worth of damage to Hart Plaza, $400,000 of which was done to the fountain itself.

The fountain was repaired by Fountains By Water Works, a water feature design-build firm based out of Rockville, Maryland. The repair project was funded by the city of Detroit in part of its preparation for the 2024 NFL draft, which drew more than 750,000 fans. The project was completed in six months in order to be ready for draft day.

Luke and Ryan Miller, along with Brian Greenblatt, were the masterminds behind the rebuild itself and are often referred to as pioneers of the modern fountain repair industry.

=== Pylon ===
Pylon is a stainless steel spire sculpture designed by Isamu Noguchi positioned near the entrance to Hart Plaza. The sculpture, which stands 120 feet (37 m) tall with a 7 square feet (0.65 m^{2}) base, is a double helix that appears to make a quarter turn between the bottom and the top. The design for the pylon was inspired by the double helix of DNA.

The name of the sculpture refers to Egyptian gateway structures that resembled a truncated pyramid. These structures were commonly built in significant locations by Egyptian architects. The word came into the western European languages and was used to describe a tall tower, such as those used to support elevated wires.

The sculpture was commissioned via Smith, Hinchman and Grylls Associates, Inc. and built in 1981 as a companion piece to the Horace E. Dodge and Son Memorial Fountain. The $402,000 total cost of the sculpture was paid for by funds from the Detroit Capital Gifts Committee, which determines how financial gifts to the City of Detroit will be spent.

=== Transcending ===
Transcending is an arch sculpture and the Michigan Labor Legacy Landmark. It is located west of the entrance to Hart Plaza near the intersection of Woodward Avenue and Jefferson Avenue and was dedicated on August 30, 2003.

In 2000, the Michigan Labor History Society established a project to create a monument that would celebrate Michigan's contributions to the labor movement. Funding was obtained from the United Automobile Workers, AFL–CIO, and other civic and labor organizations. Sculptors were invited to enter a competition and submit sketches of their designs; 120 artists entered the competition. The selection committee chose Transcending, by David Barr of Novi, Michigan and Sergio de Guisti, an Italian sculptor living in Redford Charter Township, Michigan at the time of the sculptor's selection. The two steel arcs, the work of David Barr, stretch 63 feet (19 m) into the sky and weigh 30 short tons (27 t). Barr saw them as an elegantly stylized gear emerging from the ground. They are not joined and many assume that it is to remind viewers of the unfinished mission of the American labor movement. However, at night, a light project from one of the arcs at its zenith to the other. The sculptors assumed that viewers would focus on that light. To them, this light symbolized the energy of workers.

At the base there are fourteen Vermont granite boulders, each 6 feet (1.8 m) in height. The bas reliefs on the boulders are the work of Sergio de Guisti. They are meant to symbolize the sacrifices and achievements of American workers. There are also more than a dozen plaques commemorating the accomplishments of the American labor movement such as the prohibition of child labor, free public school education and employer paid pensions and health care.

The monument stands close to where Martin Luther King Jr. first gave his "I Have a Dream" speech on June 20, 1963, a speech that was repeated later that year at the Lincoln Memorial during the March on Washington for Jobs and Freedom. One of Dr. King's phrases - "The arc of history bends toward justice" - is included in the sculpture.

A few lines of Melba Boyd's poem "We Want Our City Back" is also inscribed on the sculpture.
