= Oakland University =

Public research university in Michigan, US

Coordinates: 42°40′22″N 83°12′57″W

- Former name: Michigan State University-Oakland (1957–1963)
- Motto: Seguir virtute e canoscenza (Italian) from Dante's Inferno
- Motto in English: "Seek virtue and knowledge"
- Type: Public research university
- Established: 1957; 69 years ago
- Accreditation: HLC
- Academic affiliations: CUMU; Space-grant
- Endowment: $171.4 million (August 2025)
- President: Ora Pescovitz
- Students: 16,108 (fall 2022)
- Undergraduates: 12,841 (fall 2022)
- Postgraduates: 3,267 (fall 2022)
- Location: Auburn Hills and Rochester Hills, Michigan, United States
- Campus: 1,443 acres (5.84 km^{2}); Large suburb
- Newspaper: The Oakland Post
- Colors: Black and gold
- Nickname: Golden Grizzlies
- Sporting affiliations: NCAA Division I – Horizon League
- Mascot: Grizz
- Website: www.oakland.edu

Oakland University (OU or Oakland) is a public research university in Auburn Hills and Rochester Hills, Michigan, United States. (Note: Most of the land area of the campus is located in Rochester Hills, while most of its academic and residential buildings are located in Auburn Hills. Despite frequently being referred to as located in Rochester, Michigan, and its mailing address being listed there, no part of Oakland University is actually located in or adjacent to the city of Rochester. See also: "2020 CENSUS - CENSUS BLOCK MAP: Auburn Hills city, MI" (PDF). U.S. Census Bureau. pp. 2-3 (PDF pp. 3-4/4). "2020 CENSUS – CENSUS BLOCK MAP: Rochester Hills city, MI" (PDF). U.S. Census Bureau. pp. 1, 3 (PDF pp. 2, 4/5).) Founded in 1957 through a donation of Matilda Dodge Wilson and husband Alfred G. Wilson, it was initially known as Michigan State University-Oakland, operating under the Michigan State University Board of Trustees, before gaining institutional independence from the board in 1970.

Oakland University is one of the eight research universities in the State of Michigan and is classified among "R2: Doctoral Universities – High research activity". The university offers 132 bachelor's degree programs, 138 professional graduate certificate programs, master's degree programs, and doctoral degree programs, including those offered by the Oakland University William Beaumont School of Medicine. It had a total enrollment of more than 16,108 students in fall of 2022.

The university's site comprises the Main Campus, Meadow Brook Estate, and two nationally ranked golf courses spread across 1,443 acres (5.84 km2). Meadow Brook Hall, a U.S. National Historic Landmark and the fourth-largest historic house museum in the United States, is located on the site.

Previously known as the Pioneers, Oakland's athletic teams were renamed the Golden Grizzlies in 1998. They compete in the NCAA Division I Horizon League.

== History ==
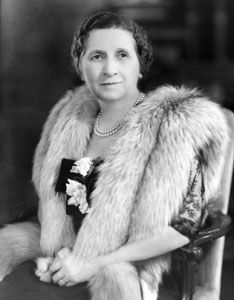
Matilda Dodge Wilson, co-founded Michigan State University–Oakland, now Oakland University, with her husband Alfred Wilson, and John A. Hannah.

In 1908, John Francis Dodge and his wife Matilda purchased a farmhouse and 320 acres (130 ha) of land known as Meadow Brook Farms, located in central Oakland County.

In 1920, Matilda inherited John's fortune upon his death, soon remarrying to a lumber baron, Alfred G. Wilson. Between 1926 and 1929, the couple built Meadow Brook Hall on the land.

Oakland University was created in 1957 when Matilda Dodge Wilson and her second husband, Alfred Wilson, donated their 1,443-acre (5.84 km^{2}) estate to Michigan State University, including Meadow Brook Hall, Sunset Terrace and all the estate's other buildings and collections, along with $2 million. Main campus buildings were completed on Squirrel Road in Pontiac Township (now the city of Auburn Hills). Originally known as Michigan State University–Oakland, the university enrolled its first students in 1959, was renamed Oakland University in 1963, and has been officially independent of Michigan State University since 1970.

Wilson demanded that U.S. Postmaster General Arthur Summerfield let the university use a Rochester, Michigan, mailing address (201 Meadow Brook Rd., Rochester, Michigan 48309), even though the main campus was in Pontiac Township (now the city of Auburn Hills). After Wilson reminded him that she had contributed to his administration, Summerfield granted her request. University and city officials signed a partnership agreement in 2003 to officially recognize the relationship between Rochester and Oakland University.

In September 2009, tenured faculty members represented by the Oakland University chapter of the American Association of University Professors went on strike. Issues of contention included the university claiming ownership of professors' copyrights and patents, refusing to allow faculty input into matters of class size and curricula, reduction of health benefits and a three-year salary freeze. The salary freeze was in contrast to university president Gary Russi, who had just received a $100,000 raise. The university's board of trustees maintained that the strike was illegal and filed a lawsuit against the Oakland AAUP. After a week's strike, the faculty and administration came to an agreement on a three-year contract, which was implemented.

During the 2012 Republican presidential primaries, Oakland University hosted a debate between Republican presidential candidates on 9 November 2011. CNBC televised the debate nationally, and the Michigan Republican Party co-sponsored the debate with CNBC.

In 2013, the Oakland University Board of Trustees approved a $65 million investment in campus expansion and improvement projects. Completed in the fall of 2014, projects included: construction of a nearly $30 million student housing complex; dramatic enhancement of outdoor recreation and athletic fields; construction of a 1,240-space parking structure, and; construction of new headquarters for facility and grounds maintenance operations.

On 4 May 2017, the board announced Ora Hirsch Pescovitz as Oakland University's seventh president. Her tenure began on 1 July 2017, under a 5-year contract. In September 2023, her contract was extended to June 2031.

For the fall 2022 semester, Oakland University had an enrollment of 16,108 students. Oakland University is the 6th largest of the 4-year universities in Michigan.

== Academics ==
=== Undergraduate admissions ===
Undergraduate admissions statistics
- 2021 entering class
- Admit rate: 92.2 (▲ +5.9)
- Yield rate: 21.0 (▼ −7.1)

Test scores middle 50%
- SAT Total: 990-1220 (among 60% of FTFs)
- ACT Composite: 21-29 (among 10% of FTFs)

Undergraduate admissions to Oakland University is considered "selective" by U.S. News & World Report. For the Class of 2025 (enrolled fall 2021), Oakland University received 10,475 applications and accepted 9,661 (92.2%). Of those accepted, 2,025 enrolled, a yield rate (the percentage of accepted students who choose to attend the university) of 21.0%. Oakland University's freshman retention rate is 73.1%, with 56% going on to graduate within six years.

The enrolled first-year class of 2025 had the following standardized test scores: the middle 50% range (25th percentile-75th percentile) of SAT scores was 990-1220, while the middle 50% range of ACT scores was 21-29.

Fall First-Time Freshman Statistics
	2021	2020	2019	2018	2017	2016
Applicants	10,475	12,054	12,443	12,309	10,296	10,688
Admits	9,661	9,776	10,334	10,328	8,691	9,229
Admit rate	92.2	81.1	83.1	83.9	84.4	86.3
Enrolled	2,025	2,258	2,667	2,700	2,456	2,595
Yield rate	21.0	23.1	25.8	26.1	28.3	28.1
ACT composite* (out of 36)	21-29 (10%^{†})	20-27 (23%^{†})	20-27 (26%^{†})	21-28 (30%^{†})	21-27 (43%^{†})	20-27 (99%^{†})
SAT composite* (out of 1600)	990-1220 (60%^{†})	990-1210 (89%^{†})	1020-1220 (89%^{†})	1010-1240 (90%^{†})	1010-1230 (80%^{†})	—
* middle 50% range^{†} percentage of first-time freshmen who chose to submit

=== Academic divisions ===
Academic rankings

National
- Forbes: 423
- U.S. News & World Report: 231-300
- Washington Monthly: 218

Oakland University offers 132 bachelor's degree programs and 138 graduate programs (professional certificates, master's degrees, and doctoral degrees). The main academic units of the university are the College of Arts and Sciences, the School of Business Administration, the School of Education and Human Services, the School of Engineering and Computer Science, the School of Health Sciences, School of Nursing, and the Oakland University William Beaumont School of Medicine. Additionally, Oakland University supports an Honors College and various study abroad programs. Its three most popular undergraduate majors, by 2021 graduates, were Registered Nursing/Registered Nurse (458), Health Professions and Related Clinical Sciences (285), and Psychology (161).

In 2007, plans were established to start a medical school on the Oakland University campus in partnership with William Beaumont Hospital, called the Oakland University William Beaumont School of Medicine (OUWB or OUWBSM) came to fruition. The medical school was founded in 2008 with classes starting in fall of 2011. OUWB is the fourth medical school in the state of Michigan to offer the M.D. degree, received over 3,200 applications for the inaugural class of 50 students. OUWBSM has 225 students as of Fall 2013 and 500 were planned for 2017. The founding dean of the medical school is Robert Folberg, M.D.

The Oakland University – Beaumont Nurse Anesthesia Graduate Program started in 1991. In 2011, U.S. News & World Report ranked the program tied for 17th in the United States.

Oakland University's School of Business Administration (SBA) is accredited by the AACSB-International accreditation in both business and accounting. It also offers Michigan's only Executive MBA program with concentrations in Health Care and IS Leadership. In 2009, the SBA celebrated its 40th anniversary.

== Research centers and institutes ==
As part of its research mission, Oakland University also supports a number of major research centers and institutes, including the Center for Biomedical Research, the Center for Robotics and Advanced Automation, the Fastening and Joining Research Institute, the Human Systems Initiative, and the renowned Eye Research Institute. Furthermore, Oakland University's Smart Zone Business Incubator provides entrepreneurial resources and expertise to support and foster new technology-based and life science businesses.

== Campus ==
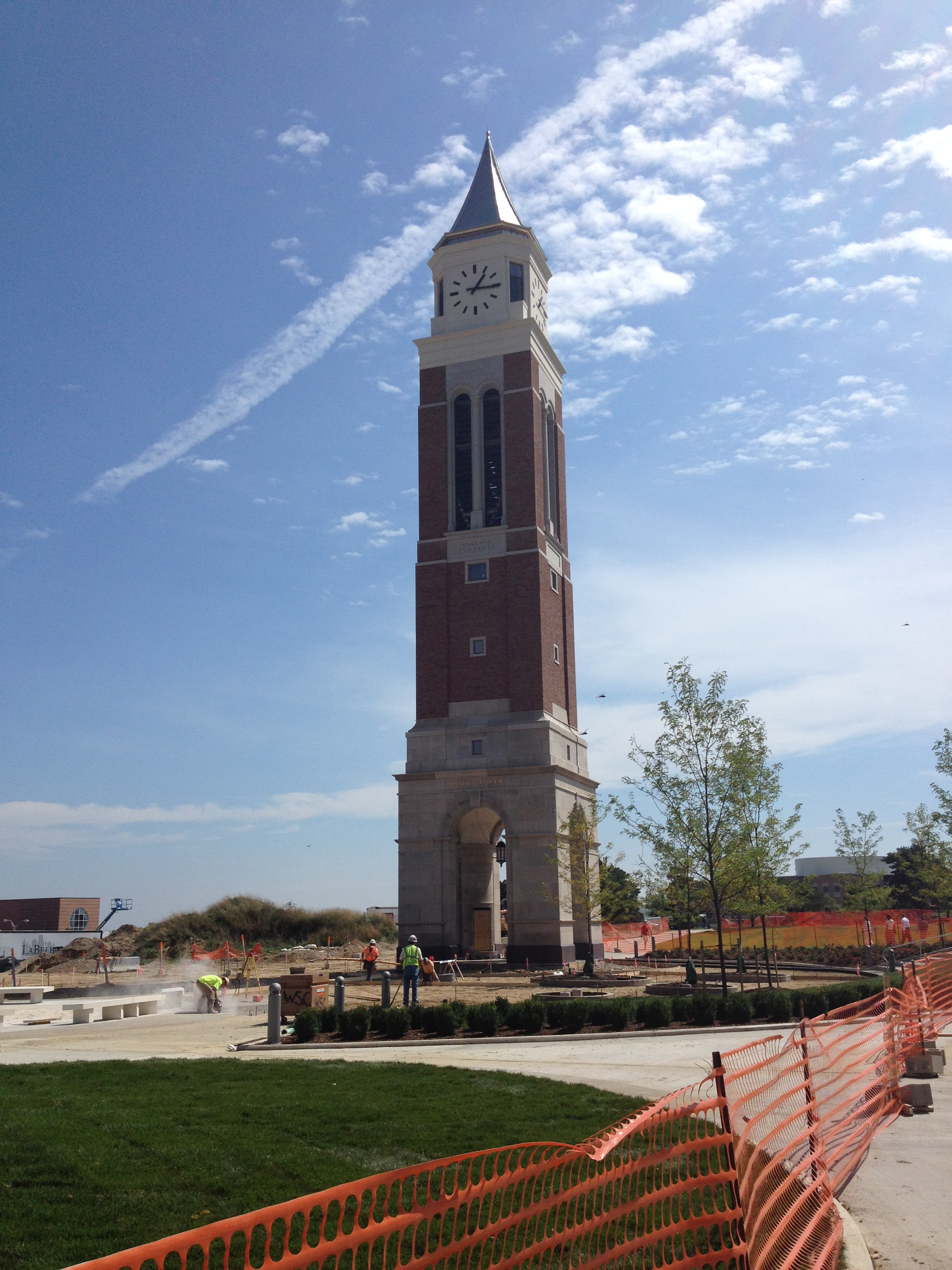
Elliott Tower, completed in 2014

Oakland University's main campus, which encompasses 1,443 acres (5.84 km^{2}), includes trails and biking paths and two nationally ranked golf courses. The university's land in Auburn Hills and Rochester Hills is divided into the Main Campus, Meadow Brook Estate, and two golf courses.

Meadow Brook Theatre, which was founded in 1967, is the largest non-profit professional theater in Michigan, and presents a wide variety of award-winning productions throughout the year. There is also the Oakland University Art Gallery on campus, which was formerly known as the Meadow Brook Art Gallery.

Kresge Library is the main library of Oakland University. It also contains the Oakland University Archives, the Historical Abraham Lincoln Collection, the Jane M. Bingham Historical Children's Collection, and a tech center. The library is named after Stanley and Sebastian Kresge.

In 2009, an 18-hole disc golf course opened. Grizzly Oaks was co-designed by student Jarrett Schlaff and licensed by the Professional Disc Golf Association.

Oakland University's student union, the Oakland Center, was renovated and expanded in 2018. The Oakland Center houses the offices of student organizations, a large food court with multiple restaurants, the student bookstore, a cafe, a pool hall and gaming center, a Student Technology Center, the campus newspaper The Oakland Post, computer labs, conference rooms, as well as the offices of the university radio station, WXOU (88.3 FM). Oakland University also has its own television station (OU TV) which is broadcast on-campus and to the local community.

=== Meadow Brook Estate ===
This portion of Oakland University consists of the historic Meadow Brook Hall and the land and buildings surrounding it. The hall, which is a 110-room Tudor revival–style mansion completed in 1929 as Oakland University founder Matilda Dodge Wilson's Oakland County estate, is listed on the National Register of Historic Places. Meadow Brook Hall is the fourth-largest historic house museum in the United States, and houses a vast collection of historically significant art and furniture, including paintings by Rembrandt, Anthony van Dyck, Rosa Bonheur, Gilbert Stuart, Joshua Reynolds, John Constable, and Thomas Gainsborough, as well as sculptures by Antoine-Louis Barye, Frederic Remington, Cyrus Edwin Dallin, and Herbert Haseltine. Meadow Brook Hall is frequently utilized as a site for select university functions, including the Meadow Brook Ball, a popular student event. Until 2010, Meadow Brook Hall and its grounds were the site of the annual Meadow Brook Concours d'Elegance.

The Meadow Brook Music Festival is an outdoor entertainment venue with an on-site pavilion which accommodates close to 8,000 people. In addition to being the site of spring-time graduation ceremonies, Meadow Brook Music Festival also hosts comedians and musical acts. Meadow Brook Music Festival is managed by 313 Presents.

==== Golf courses ====
Oakland University has two nationally ranked golf courses that make up most of the southern portion of its land. Katke-Cousins sits on 320 acres (130 ha). Some of the course's 18 holes remain from the 9-hole course John Dodge built when he lived at the estate. The other course, opened in 2000, is the R & S Sharf course.

==== Oakland West Center ====
In April 2022, the Oakland University Board of Trustees approved the purchase of 18 acres of property two miles west of the main campus. The property contains a 141,245 square-foot building that had previously been used by Baker College. The property is now named "Oakland West Center". The university began offering classes at the center in late Summer 2022, with Baker College and Oakland University classes co-existing in the center during the Summer and Fall 2022 semesters. Baker College ceased all operations at the center at the end of the Fall 2022 semester.

=== Macomb County ===
An office plaza in downtown Mount Clemens, in Macomb County, was donated to the university in 2010 by Gebran Anton and Stuart Frankel. It was repurposed and opened for the fall 2011 semester as the Anton/Frankel Center. It offered several undergraduate and graduate programs.In the summer of 2024, the university discontinued class offerings from the location and vacated the building. On February 7th, 2025, the Board of Trustees approved the sale of the property.

Oakland University is also among the 12 colleges and universities offering programs at Macomb Community College's University Center.

== Oakland University Art Gallery, and art collection ==
The Oakland University Art Gallery is a civic art exhibition venue located in West Wilson Hall. The gallery was created in 1966, and its exhibitions have garnered national and international attention, and have been reviewed in publications including Art in America, Sculpture and W.

=== Art collection ===
The collection has over 1,500 art objects. The gallery collection includes twentieth and twenty-first century paintings and sculptures by artists Richard Artschwager, Fernando Botero, Alex Katz, Malcolm Morley, Carlos Rolón, and Terry Winters.

Former Professor of Art History and Archeology Carl F. Barnes Jr., and Anna M. Barnes donated their collection of over 500 prints in 1999. Collections highlights include the print oeuvre of English print maker and portrait painter Gerald Brockhurst. Other artist highlights from this collection include William Blake, Eugène Delacroix, Albrecht Dürer, William Hogarth, John Sloan, and James Abbott McNeill Whistler.

The Tagore Collection was donated by Dr. Abanindranath Tagore in 1989. It contains calligraphy, rubbings, and scrolls. Among the scrolls, include works by Qi Baishi, Xu Beihong, Zhang Daqian, Li Keran, and Qigong, among others.

G. Mennen Williams, the 41st Governor of Michigan, donated his collection in to the gallery in 1968. Williams held the position of Assistant Secretary of State for African Affairs during the Kennedy administration and bequeathed objects acquired during his tours of duty. A majority of the objects originate from West Africa in what is now Nigeria, Mali, Côte d'Ivoire, Burkino Faso, Ghana and Benin.

== Athletics ==
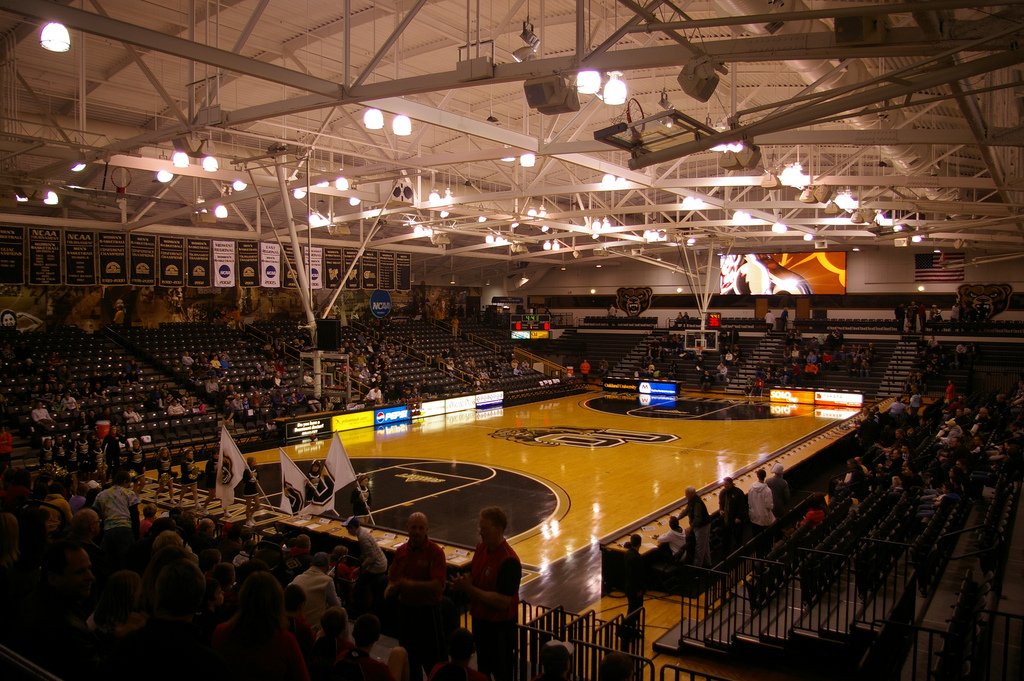
The O'rena

"OU Fight" is the Oakland University fight song. Previously known as the Pioneers, the school's teams were renamed the Golden Grizzlies in 1998.

Oakland University was used as a training camp for the Detroit Lions in 1989.

Oakland University's men's soccer team became the first Oakland team to move past the first round of their sport's respective NCAA tournament in 2007. The men's basketball team defeated Kentucky in the 2024 NCAA Tournament.

== Student life ==
Although many of Oakland's students commute from surrounding areas, there are more than 3,000 who live on campus in a variety of residence halls and student apartments. The residence halls include Hillcrest Hall, Oak View Hall, Hamlin Hall, Van Wagoner Hall, and Vandenberg Hall. Residential learning communities on Oakland University's campus include Scholars Tower and the Residential Honors College community. Eight additional buildings make up the George T. Matthews student apartments, and six major Tudor-style buildings house the Ann V. Nicholson student apartments, which were completed in 2002.

== Alumni ==
Arts and entertainment

- Curtis Armstrong – film and TV actor
- Regina Carter – jazz violinist, winner of MacArthur Fellowship
- Garrett Clayton – film and TV actor (attended)
- Robert Englund – film and TV actor (attended)
- David Hasselhoff – actor (attended)
- Jayne Houdyshell – actress, Tony Award winner
- Gayelynn McKinney – drummer, composer, and music educator
- Karen Newman – singer and actress
- Elizabeth Reaser – film and TV actress (attended)

Law

- Karen Batchelor – attorney
- Deborah Servitto – judge

Government and politics

- Fran Amos – state representative, Michigan House of Representatives
- Deborah Cherry – senator, Michigan Senate
- David J. Doyle – politician
- Renee Ellmers – politician
- Ruth Johnson – politician
- Nancy Lenoil – archivist
- Michael W. Michalak – United States Ambassador to Vietnam
- Adolph Mongo – political consultant (attended)
- Gary Yourofsky – animal rights activist

Business

- Howard Birndorf – co-founder, Hybritech
- John G. Denison – CEO of ATA Airlines
- Maximiliano Larroquette – designer of Chevrolet Volt
- James E. Schrager – professor, University of Chicago

Education

- Janet L. Holmgren – president of Mills College
- James E. Schrager – professor of business
- Richard T. Sullivan – professor of history
- Steven D. Townsend – professor of chemistry
- Thomas J. Volgy – professor of political science

Sports and media

- Andrew Anderson – bowler
- Keith Benson – basketball player
- Mike Brosseau – baseball player
- Kay Felder – basketball player
- Andrew Good – baseball player
- Brian Gregory – basketball coach
- Seb Harris – footballer
- Mike Helms – basketball player
- Don Kirkwood – baseball player (attended)
- Rawle Marshall – basketball player
- Kendrick Nunn – basketball player
- Gbemi Olateru-Olagbegi – professional radio personality, Lagos, Nigeria
- Jasna Rather – Olympic table tennis player
- Tom Stanton – author
- Brian Stuard – golfer
- Jennifer Valoppi – TV journalist
- Kelly Williams – basketball player
