= Matilda Dodge Wilson =

American politician (1883–1967)

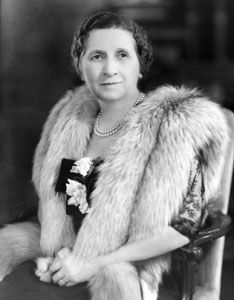

43rd Lieutenant Governor of Michigan
- In office November 19, 1940 – January 1, 1941
- Governor: Luren Dickinson
- Preceded by: Luren Dickinson
- Succeeded by: Frank Murphy

Personal details
- Born: Matilda Rausch; October 19, 1883 Walkerton, Ontario, Canada
- Died: September 19, 1967 (aged 83)
- Party: Republican
- Spouses: John Francis Dodge (1907–1920; his death); Alfred G. Wilson (1925–1962; his death)
- Relations: Isabel Dodge Sloane (step-daughter)
- Children: 5 (including Frances Dodge)
- Occupation: Philanthropist, politician

Matilda Dodge Wilson (née Rausch; October 19, 1883 – September 19, 1967) was an American politician and heiress who was the 43rd lieutenant governor of Michigan. Ranked as one of the wealthiest women in the world, she was the widow of John Francis Dodge, who co-founded the Dodge motor car company in Detroit with his brother Horace Elgin Dodge. She co-founded the Oakland campus of Michigan State University, now Oakland University, with her husband Alfred Wilson, and John A. Hannah. The new university was built on her 1,400-acre (5.7 km^{2}) estate, Meadow Brook Farms.

== Biography ==
Matilda Rausch was born to German immigrants George and Margaret Rausch, in Walkerton, Ontario, Canada. Her family moved to Detroit in 1884. She attended public school in Detroit and then attended and graduated from the Gorsline Business College in the same city. In 1902, she began working for the Dodge Motor Company and five years later, she married founder John Dodge.

After Dodge's death in 1920, Matilda inherited his share of the Dodge Brothers Company and became one of the wealthiest women in the United States. Soon thereafter, she met lumber baron Alfred G. Wilson at the First Presbyterian Church in Detroit and they married June 29, 1925. Upon Alfred Wilson's death on April 6, 1962, Matilda again received the bulk of her husband's estate.

Matilda and John Dodge had three children, Frances (1914–1971), Daniel (1917–1938) and Anna Margaret (1919–1924). In addition, she was stepmother to John's three children from his first marriage (one of whom was Isabel Dodge Sloane). Matilda and Alfred Wilson adopted two children, Richard and Barbara.

== Political career ==
In 1931, Wilson and Gilbert Daane were nominated by the Michigan Republican Party for two seats on the State Board of Agriculture, an eight-member statewide elected body that governed Michigan State University. They won both seats by a wide margin, with Wilson placing first in a field of eight candidates with 40 percent of the vote, and Daane placing second with 39 percent. She and Daane were renominated in 1937, but narrowly lost re-election to Democrats James Jakway and Lavina Masselink. Wilson placed fourth, losing by 5,171 votes.

On November 19, 1940, outgoing Governor Luren Dickinson appointed Wilson as Lieutenant Governor of Michigan, and she became the first woman to serve as Lieutenant Governor in American history. Attorney General Thomas Read argued that Dickinson had no power to make the appointment, because Dickinson remained Lieutenant Governor, and merely acted as Governor, upon the death of Governor Frank Fitzgerald in 1939. Wilson did not have the opportunity to preside over the Michigan Senate, but did ostensibly serve as acting Governor when Dickinson was out of the state, and attended a state Administrative Board meeting.

== Meadow Brook Hall and Music Hall ==
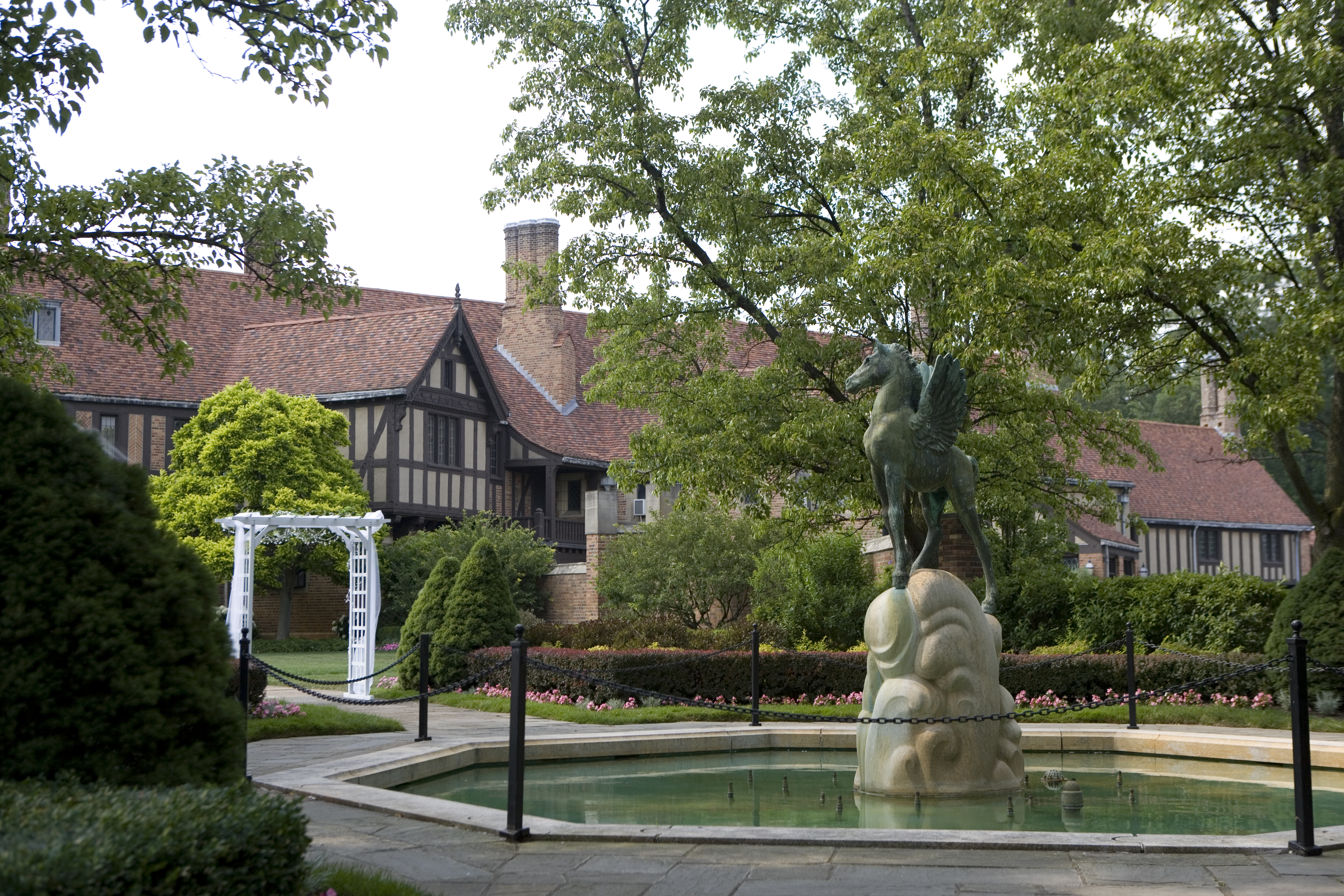
Meadow Brook Hall

She was the author of A Place in the Country, a guidebook to her home, Meadow Brook Hall. In it she takes the reader through the mansion and introduces the reader to her art collection which includes works by Sir Joshua Reynolds, Thomas Gainsborough, Gilbert Stuart, George Romney, Frederic Remington, Émile van Marcke, Rosa Bonheur, Justus Sustermans and Louis Betts.

During the later 1920s, Wilson hired the Detroit architectural firm of Smith Hinchman & Grylls to design two of the Detroit area's notable buildings, Music Hall Center for the Performing Arts (1928) and Meadow Brook Hall (1929). Both were designed by William Kapp and both included architectural sculpture by Detroit sculptor Corrado Parducci.

== Final resting place ==
In 1939, Matilda and Alfred Wilson had constructed a pale granite Art Deco style mausoleum in Woodlawn Cemetery, designed by New York architect William Henry Deacy. and again, featuring sculpture by Corrado Parducci. It is located near the south wall of the Dodge family mausoleum where her first husband was interred in 1920.

== See also ==
- Meadow Brook Hall
- List of female lieutenant governors in the United States

Political offices
Preceded by Luren Dickinson	Lieutenant Governor of Michigan; 1940–1941	Succeeded by Frank Murphy
