= James E. Schrager =

James E. Schrager is a Clinical Professor of Entrepreneurship and Strategy at the University of Chicago Booth School of Business. He studies the use of strategy to help executives predict outcomes and has three times won the Emory Williams Award for Teaching Excellence. According to his University of Chicago Booth faculty profile, Schrager teaches courses in entrepreneurship and strategy and has published on topics including behavioral strategy and new venture strategy. He was named by BusinessWeek magazine as one of the top twelve U.S. teachers of entrepreneurship. In 2017, he was given the Faculty Excellence Award at the University of Chicago Booth School of Business to recognize outstanding teaching.

Schrager developed one of the first courses on New Venture Strategy (as opposed to traditional corporate strategy courses). His work is heavily influenced by that of Herbert A. Simon and by the concepts of bounded rationality, which form the basis for his approach to strategy. He co-authored a paper on "Behavioral Strategy: A Foundational View" with Albert Madansky, which developed a set of ideas based on the work of Simon on how strategy decisions are made. His latest research on strategy decisions is recapped in "Capital Ideas" (Spring 2014), wherein he and co-author Madansky are undertaking human subject experiments to discover how strategic insight can be developed to solve strategy puzzles.

He is a consultant on strategy to companies ranging in size from startups to the largest multinational corporations. He is a member of "The Experts" panel for the Wall Street Journal, answering questions at WSJ.com and in the print edition.

Schrager's background includes MBA, CPA, and JD credentials and a PhD in organizational behavior and policy from the University of Chicago. He has also taught at the University of Notre Dame, where he was named MBA Teacher of the Year.

Schrager is a long-time Porsche enthusiast who has written for Excellence and was a contributing editor for Porsche Panorama and the 356 Registry. He continues to write for Sports Car Market magazine and has authored two books on vintage Porsches. Both books are out of print but copies can be found at vintage booksellers.
