= Hugh Dillman =

American actor (1885–1956)

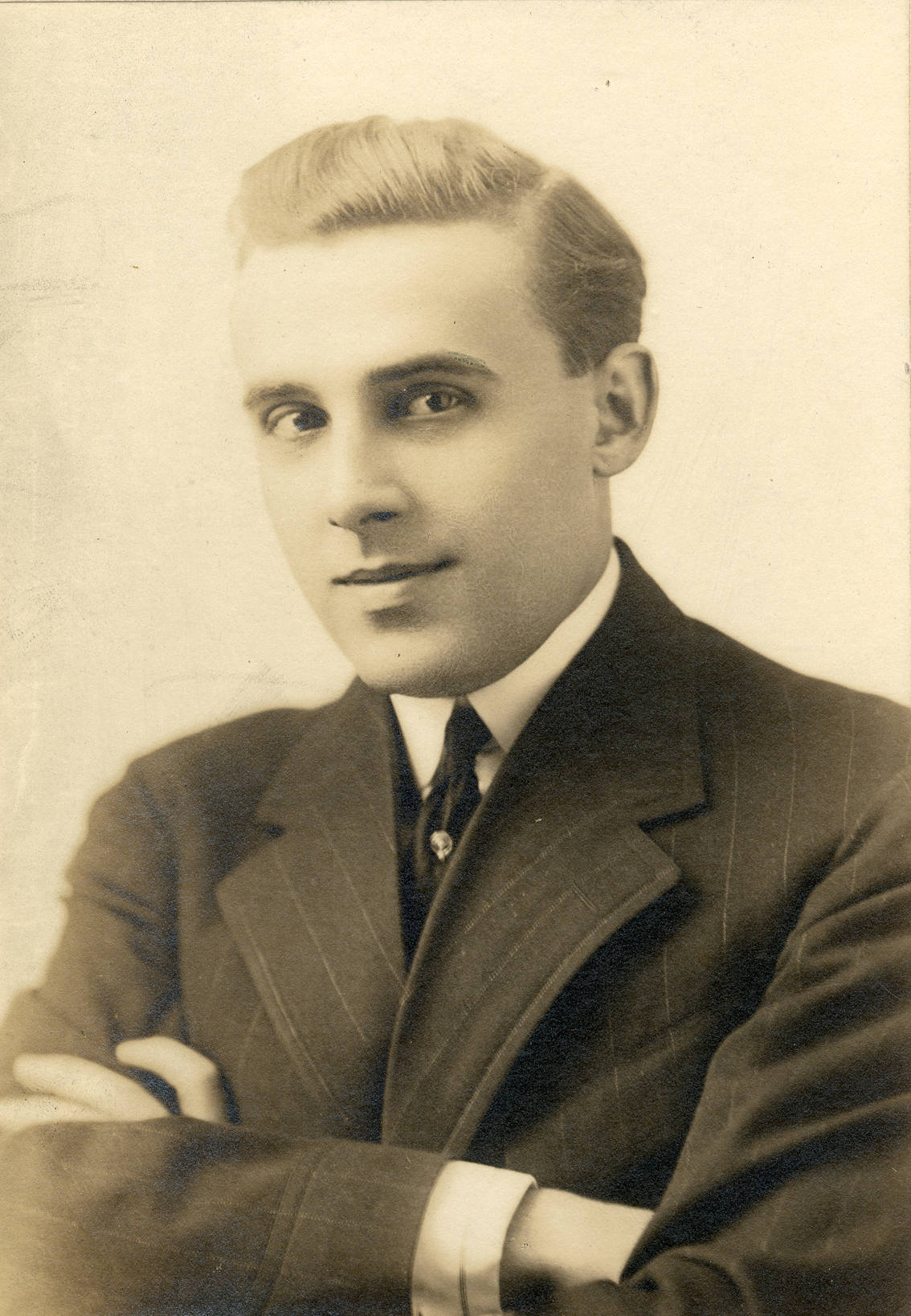
- Dillman in 1912
- Born: Hugh Dillman McGaughy; February 8, 1885; Chesterville, Ohio, U.S.
- Died: July 7, 1956 (aged 71); Columbus, Ohio, U.S.
- Resting place: Green Lawn Cemetery
- Occupation: Actor
- Years active: 1900s–1919
- Spouses: Marjorie Rambeau (m. 1919; div. 1923) Anna Thompson Dodge (m. 1926; div. 1947)

Hugh Dillman McGaughy (February 8, 1885 – July 7, 1956) was an American Broadway and silent film actor. Dillman served as a Navy recruiter during World War I. His first marriage was to actress Marjorie Rambeau in 1919. They divorced in 1923.

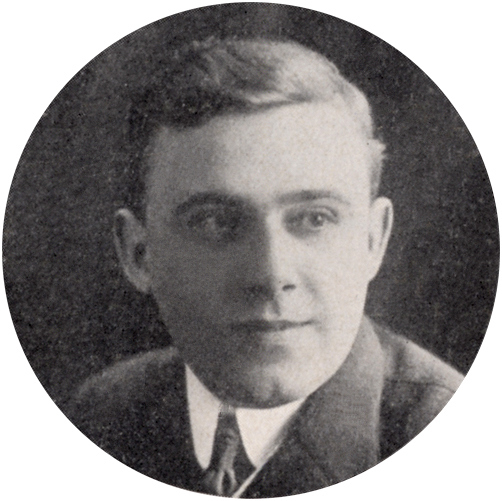
Dillman in 1918

Dillman later sold real estate in Palm Beach, Florida and was one of the founding members of the Society of the Four Arts. He was the sales agent for Mrs. Dodge's purchase of the largest house in Palm Beach, Addison Mizner’s Playa Rienta.

== Personal life ==
In 1926, he and Mrs. Anna Thompson Dodge, who was 19 years his senior and heiress of the Dodge Automobile fortune, were married. They divorced in 1947. Hugh continued to run a real estate business and orchard nursery in Palm Beach, and the family lived at the former Bush mansion in Marble Cliff at 1550 Roxbury Road near Columbus, Ohio.
