= Meadow Brook Hall =

- Meadow Brook Farms
- U.S. National Register of Historic Places
- U.S. National Historic Landmark
- Michigan State Historic Site
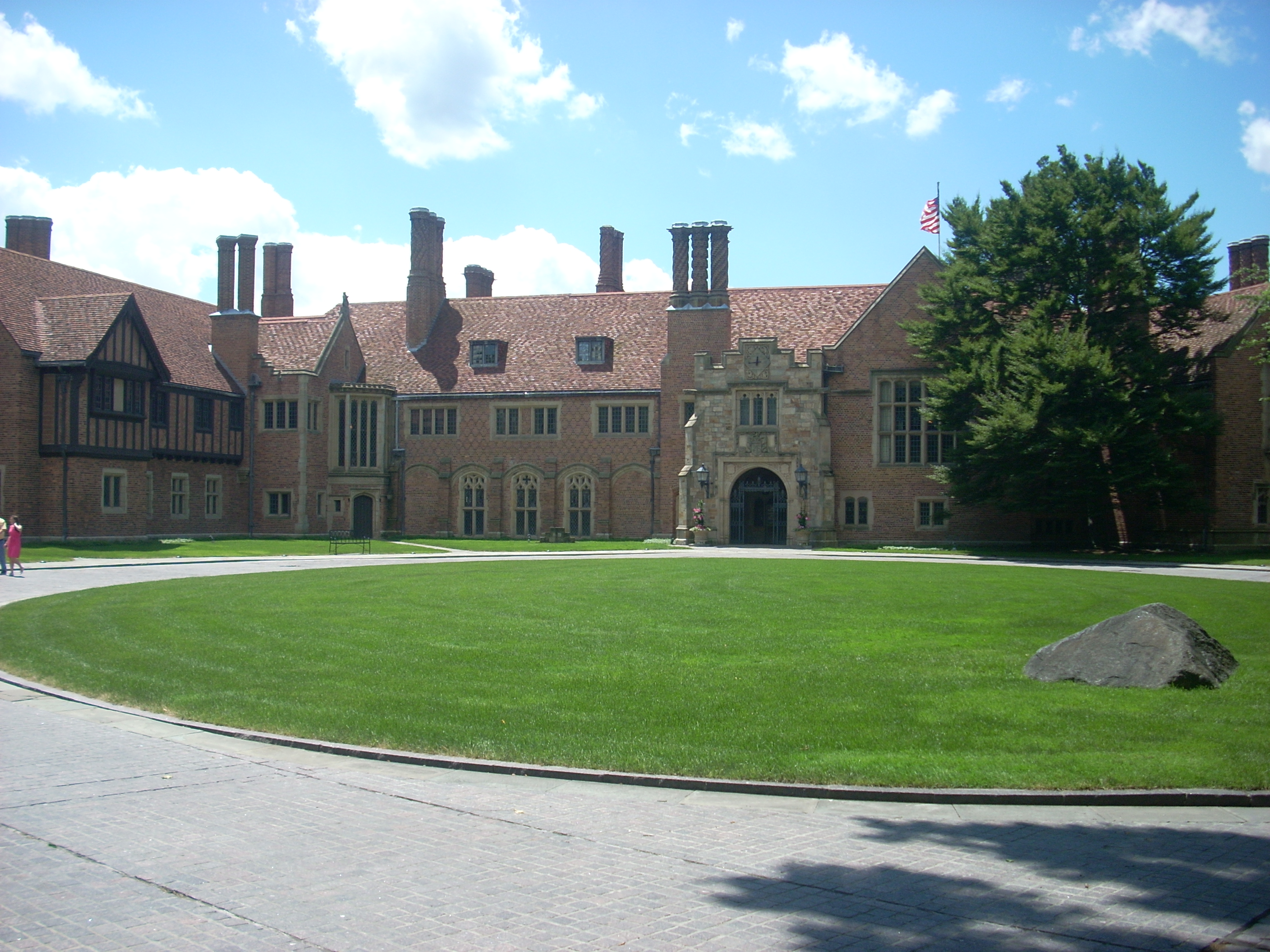
- Estate of Matilda Dodge Wilson

- Location within Michigan Location within the United States
- Interactive map
- Location: 350 Estate Drive; Rochester Hills, Michigan
- Coordinates: 42°40′19″N 83°12′04″W
- Built: 1926–1929
- Architect: William E. Kapp; Smith, Hinchman & Grylls
- Architectural style: Tudor Revival
- NRHP reference No.: 79001166

Significant dates
- Added to NRHP: April 17, 1979
- Designated NHL: March 2, 2012
- Designated MSHS: November 3, 1976

Meadow Brook Hall is a Tudor Revival style mansion located at 350 Estate Drive in Rochester Hills, Michigan. It was built between 1926 and 1929 by the heiress to the Dodge automaker fortune, Matilda Dodge Wilson, and her second husband, lumber baron Alfred Wilson. Covering 88,000 square feet (8,200 m^{2}) with 110 rooms, the structure is the fourth largest historic mansion museum in the United States, and is classified as one of America's Castles. In 1957, the mansion and the surrounding property and buildings were donated to the state of Michigan in order to fund Michigan State University–Oakland, now known as Oakland University. The structure was named a National Historic Landmark in 2012.

== History ==
Meadow Brook Farms originally belonged to Matilda's first husband, automotive tycoon John F. Dodge. He purchased the property along with the large white farmhouse off Adams Road as a holiday retreat for his family. The mansion is located on a 1,443-acre (5.84 km^{2}) estate off South Adams Road; Dodge added a nine-hole golf course, some of the holes of which still follow the current Katke-Cousins 18-hole course on the property. Meadow Brook Hall was constructed between 1926 and 1929 by Matilda Dodge Wilson and her second husband, Alfred Wilson at a cost of $4 million (equivalent to $56.6 million in 2024). The couple also owned "Breakwater", an oceanfront home in Bar Harbor, Maine, and a winter home in Scottsdale, Arizona, and also eventually a smaller retirement home, dubbed “Sunset Terrace”, on the Meadow Brook estate, which they occupied from 1953 until Alfred’s death in 1962. Matilda resided at the estate, either at Meadow Brook Hall or Sunset Terrace, for nearly forty years. The Hall was also partially closed for a brief time during the depth of the Depression during which the family resided in the existing farmhouse.

Covering 88,000 square feet (8,200 m^{2}) and with 110 rooms, the mansion is the fourth largest historic house museum in the United States. It was designed by William Kapp of the firm Smith, Hinchman & Grylls in a Tudor-revival style. The building features stonework and a plaster dining room ceiling created by Corrado Parducci. Much of the original artwork collected by the Wilsons is still found at Meadow Brook including paintings by Anthony van Dyck, Rosa Bonheur, Joshua Reynolds, John Constable and Thomas Gainsborough, as well as Tiffany glass, Stickley furniture, Meissen porcelain, and Rookwood pottery. The estate was added to the National Register of Historic Places in 1979 and National Historic Landmark in 2012.

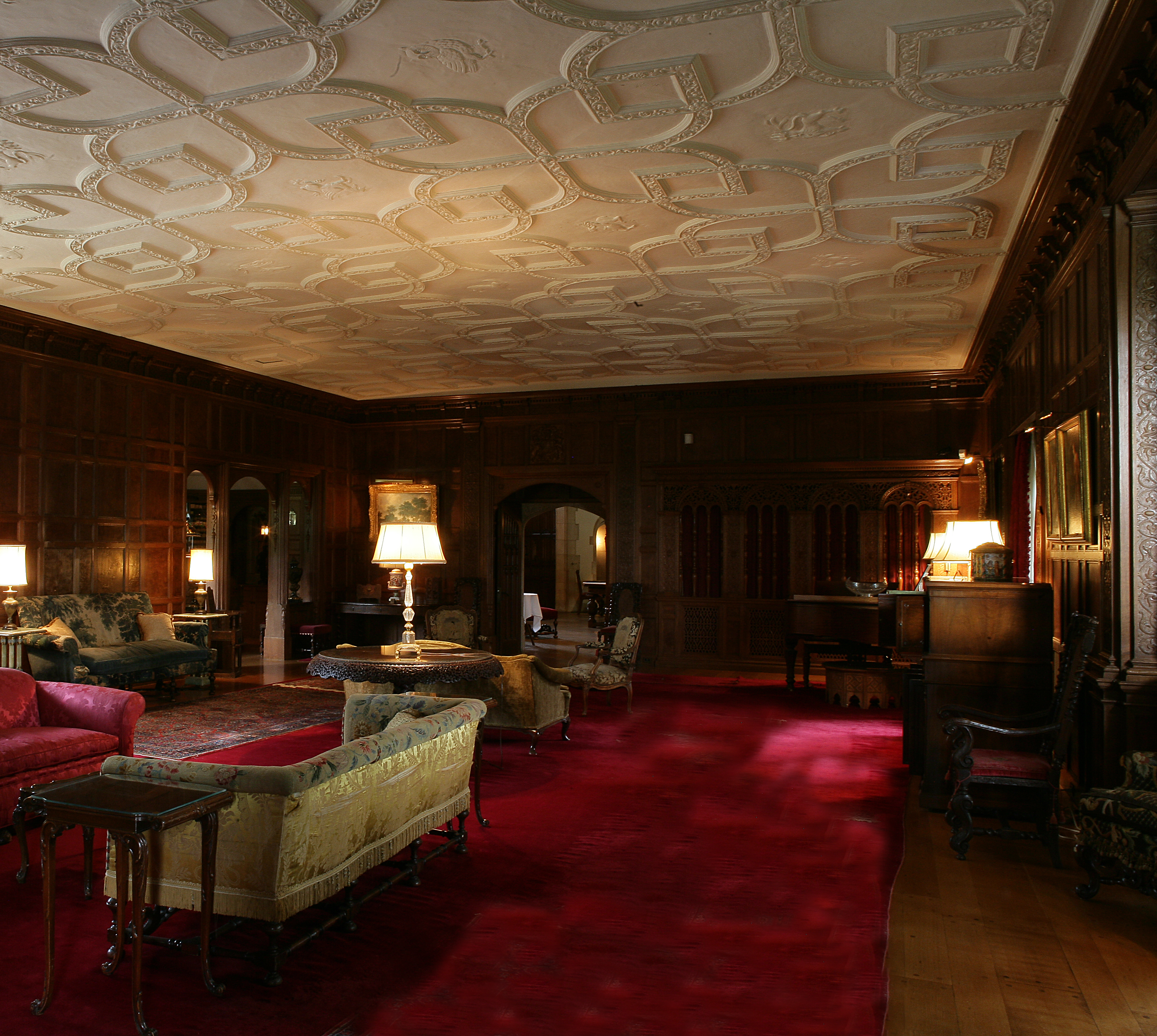
The Living Room of Meadow Brook Hall

In 1957, Alfred and Matilda Dodge Wilson donated the 1,500 acre estate to Michigan State University, along with $2 million to create a branch college campus, now known as Oakland University. The Wilsons moved out of Meadow Brook Hall in 1953 into their newly built retirement home, Sunset Terrace nearby, and lived there until Alfred's death in 1962. Mrs. Wilson moved back into Meadow Brook Hall within months of her husband's death, and lived there until her death in 1967. Sunset Terrace now serves as the residence for the current President of Oakland University.

Additional buildings which were also designed by William Kapp on the estate included:

- Knole Cottage (1926), a six-room miniature playhouse on the Meadow Brook estate.
- Sunset Terrace, a retirement home for Matilda and Alfred Wilson on Meadow Brook, which in 1963 became the Oakland University president's home.

== Concours d'Elegance ==
The Meadow Brook Concours d'Elegance was held annually during August on the grounds of Meadow Brook Hall from 1979 until 2010. This week-long event was one of the largest collector car shows in the world, and a social event in the tradition of the first Concours in 1920s Paris which was an exhibition of automotive design, craftsmanship, history and a tool for automobile manufacturers to market products. Over the years, the event also served as a fundraiser for the preservation of Meadow Brook Hall.

In 2010, promoters announced that the Concours d'Elegance would leave Meadow Brook Hall after that year for the Inn at St. John's in Plymouth, Michigan. The event is now known at the Concours d'Elegance of America at St. John's.

== See also ==
- List of castles in the United States
- List of largest houses in the United States
- List of National Historic Landmarks in Michigan
- National Register of Historic Places listings in Oakland County, Michigan
