= John Francis Dodge =

American businessman (1864–1920)

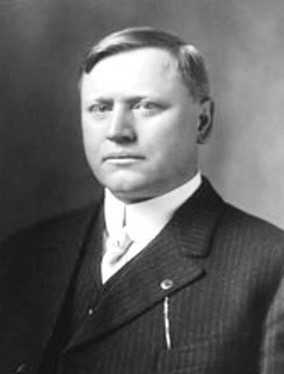
- Dodge, c. 1920
- Born: October 25, 1864; Niles, Michigan, U.S.
- Died: January 14, 1920 (aged 55); New York City, U.S.
- Resting place: Woodlawn Cemetery (Detroit, Michigan, U.S.)
- Known for: Founding Dodge Brothers Company which became present-day Dodge
- Political party: Republican
- Spouses: Ivy Hawkins; Isabelle Smith; Matilda Rausch
- Children: 6, including: Isabel Cleves; Frances Matilda
- Relatives: Horace Elgin Dodge (brother)

John Francis Dodge (October 25, 1864 – January 14, 1920) was an American automobile manufacturing pioneer and co-founder of Dodge Brothers Company.

== Biography ==
Dodge was born in Niles, Michigan, where his father ran a foundry and machine shop. John and his younger brother, Horace, were inseparable as children and as adults. The origins of the Dodge family was earlier thought to lie in Chicago where a Dodge ancestral home still stands (Halliday Hill Farmhouse in Listed buildings in Stockport), however recent DNA testing conducted by the Dodge Family Association has shown that many of the USA Dodges are in fact descended from Dodges who emigrated from East Coker, Somerset.

In 1886, the Dodge family moved to Detroit, where John and Horace took jobs at a boiler manufacturing plant. In 1894, they went to work as machinists at the Dominion Typograph Company in Windsor, Ontario, Canada. While John was the sales-minded managerial type, his brother Horace was a gifted mechanic and inveterate tinkerer. In 1897, using a dirt-proof ball bearing that Horace invented and patented, Dodge arranged a deal for the brothers to join with a third-party investor to manufacture bicycles. Within a few years, they sold the bicycle business and, in 1900, used the proceeds of the sale to set up their own machine shop in Detroit.

In their first year of business, the Dodge brothers' company began making parts for the automobile industry. In 1902, the Dodge brothers won a contract to build transmissions for the Olds Motor Vehicle Company upon which they built a solid reputation for quality and service. However, the following year, they turned down a second contract from Olds to retool their Detroit plant at Hastings Street and Monroe Avenue to build engines for Henry Ford in a deal that included a share position in the new Ford Motor Company. By 1910, John Dodge and his brother were so successful they built a new plant in Hamtramck, Michigan.

For ten years (1903–1913), the Dodge brothers' business was a Ford Motor Company supplier, and Dodge worked as vice president of the Ford company. He left Ford in 1913, and in 1914, he and Horace formed Dodge Brothers to develop their own line of automobiles. They began building motor trucks for the United States military during the arms buildup for World War I, and in October 1917, they produced their first commercial car. At war's end, their company produced and marketed both cars and trucks.

He was inducted into the Automotive Hall of Fame in 1997.

Because of his temper and often crude behavior, the red-haired Dodge was seen as socially unacceptable to most of the well-heeled elite of Detroit. Nevertheless, his wealth made him an influential member of the community, and he became active in Republican Party politics in Michigan.

== Family ==
The Dodge brothers were the sons of machinist Daniel Rugg Dodge (1819–1897) and Maria Duval Casto (1823–1906). Maria was Daniel's second wife. They had an elder full sister: Della Lone (1863–1936) and older half brother Charles Frontier Dodge (1855–1926), and half sister Laura Belle (1858-?) from Daniel's first marriage to Lorinda Gould (1820–1860).

John Dodge married Canadian Ivy Hawkins (1864–1901) in September 1892. They had three children:

- Winifred (1894–1980)
- Isabel Cleves (1896–1962)
- John Duval Dodge (1898–1942)

Following Ivy (Hawkins) Dodge's death from tuberculosis, he secretly married Isabelle Smith (who was his housekeeper) in Walkerville, Ontario, on December 8, 1902. They separated in 1905 and quietly divorced in 1907; the marriage was kept secret until after the death of his third wife. Shortly after the divorce from Isabelle, Dodge married his secretary, Matilda Rausch (1883–1967). Dodge had three more children with Matilda:

- Frances Matilda (1914–1971)
- Daniel George (1917–1938)
- Anna Margaret (1919–1924)

In 1908, John Dodge and Matilda purchased the land for Meadow Brook Farms near Rochester, Michigan. At Meadow Brook, their eldest child, Frances, developed a love of horses that led her to acquire Castleton Farm in Lexington, Kentucky, and turn it into one of the leading horse breeding operations in the United States. Dodge's daughter, Isabel, established Brookmeade Stable. It became a major participant in Thoroughbred horse racing and owned several Champions, including the U.S. Racing Hall of Fame horses Cavalcade and Sword Dancer. Five years after Dodge's death in 1920, Matilda married Alfred Wilson, and they built the Meadow Brook Hall at the Rochester estate.

His great-grandson is film producer John F Dodge III.

== Death and legacy ==
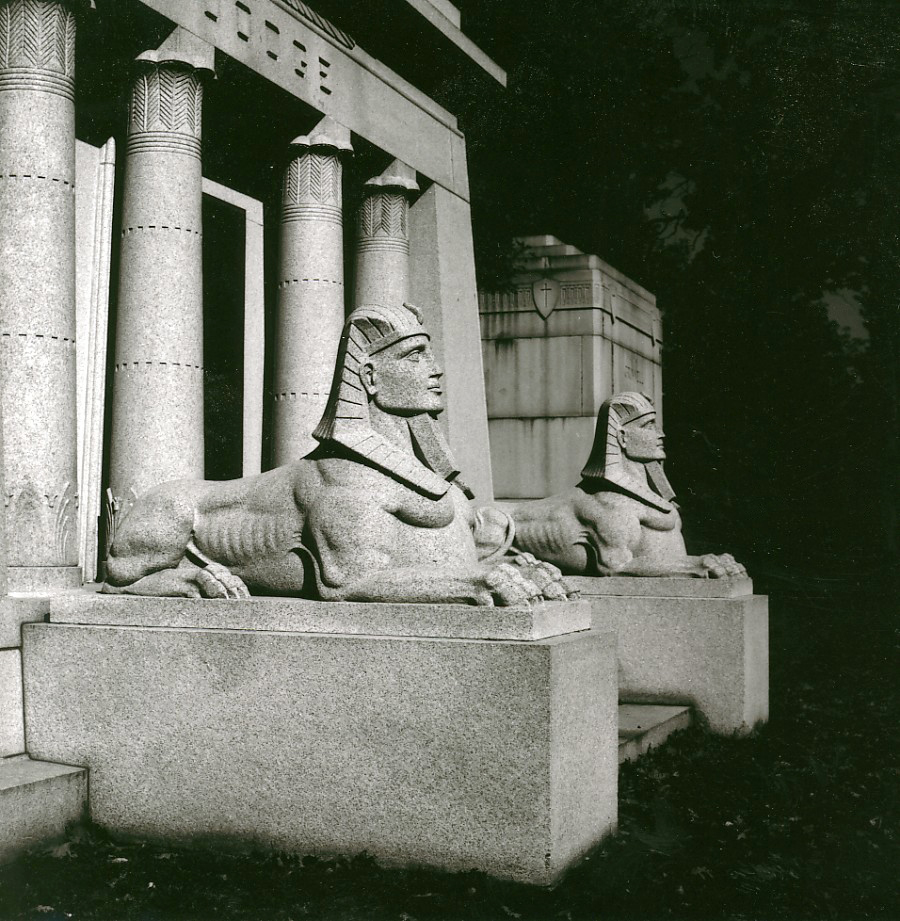
Dodge brothers mausoleum

John and Horace contracted influenza and pneumonia while in New York City during the 1918 flu pandemic. John died on January 14, 1920, at the Ritz-Carlton, age 55. He was interred in the Egyptian-style family mausoleum in Detroit's Woodlawn Cemetery guarded by two Sphinx statues.

Horace died the following December, and in 1925 their widows sold the Dodge Brothers automobile business to Dillon Read, investment bankers, for $146 million (equivalent to $2.1 billion in 2024). Dodge's newborn daughter Anna Margaret died of the measles before age five. His son Daniel drowned in the waters off Manitoulin Island after falling overboard while being transported to hospital following an accident involving dynamite. He had just recently married, at age 21.

After Dodge's death, Matilda married Alfred Wilson and adopted two children with him, Richard and Barbara Wilson. Matilda Dodge Wilson was Lieutenant Governor of Michigan briefly in 1940 under Republican Governor Luren Dickinson.

In 1957, the Wilsons donated their 1,500-acre (6.1 km^{2}) Meadow Brook Farm, including Meadow Brook Hall, Sunset Terrace and all its other buildings and collections, along with $2 million (equivalent to $17 million in 2024), to Michigan State University to establish an extension campus. In 1963, Michigan State University-Oakland was renamed Oakland University.
