= 1955 in sports =

1955 in sports describes the year's events in world sport.

== American football ==
- NFL Championship: the Cleveland Browns won 38–14 over the Los Angeles Rams at the Los Angeles Memorial Coliseum
- Rose Bowl (1954 season):
  - The Ohio State Buckeyes win 20–7 over the Southern California Trojans to win the AP Poll national championship

== Association football ==
=== England ===
- First Division – Chelsea win the 1954–55 title
- FA Cup – Newcastle United beat Manchester City 3–1

=== Peru ===
- Sporting Cristal was founded.

== Athletics ==
- March 12 to 16 – Athletics at the 1955 Pan American Games in Mexico City

== Australian rules football ==
- Victorian Football League
  - Melbourne wins the 59th VFL Premiership, defeating Collingwood 8.16 (64) to 5.6 (36) in the Grand Final.
  - Brownlow Medal awarded to Fred Goldsmith (South Melbourne)
- South Australian National Football League
  - April 30: West Torrens 9.12 (66) draws Norwood 8.18 (66) at Thebarton Oval. It is the first senior SANFL drawn match since West Adelaide 15.14 (104) drew with Port Adelaide 16.8 (104) on 24 May 1941. The intervening 788-game gap (Note: This excludes the wartime competition of 1942 to 1944.) constitutes easily the longest non-occurrence of draws in SANFL history and is twice as long as the V/AFL or VFA record, but has been exceeded three times in the WA(N)FL. (Note: The record is 948 WANFL games with no draws between Round 11, 1946 and Round 19, 1957 inclusive – largely overlapping this SANFL sequence. There were also 918 WAFL games with no draws between Round 12, 2012 and Round 14, 2022 inclusive, and 888 WANFL/WAFL games with no draws between Round 4, 1974 and Round 5, 1984 inclusive)
  - October 1: Port Adelaide 15.11 (101) defeats Norwood 5.8 (38) for their second consecutive premiership
  - Magarey Medal awarded to Lindsay Head (West Torrens)
- West Australian Football League
  - October 8: Perth 11.11 (77) defeat East Fremantle 11.9 (75) for their first premiership since 1907 in champion ruckman Merv McIntosh's final match.
  - Sandover Medal awarded to John Todd (South Fremantle)

== Bandy ==
- Federation of International Bandy inaugurated at Stockholm by Finland, Norway, Sweden and the USSR. The Soviet Union now adopts the international rules of the game developed in England in the 19th century.

== Baseball ==
- Philadelphia Athletics move to Kansas City, Missouri and become the Kansas City Athletics
- April 23 – The White Sox tally a franchise record 29 runs at Kansas City. Sherm Lollar is 5-for-6 with a pair of home runs and five RBI, while reserve outfielder Bob Nieman and infielder Walt Dropo drive in seven runs apiece, and Chico Carrasquel hits 5-for-6 with five runs in the 29–6 victory over the Athletics
- World Series – October 4 – The Brooklyn Dodgers win 4 games to 3 over the New York Yankees; Series MVP is pitcher Johnny Podres, Brooklyn

== Basketball ==
- NCAA Men's Basketball Championship – San Francisco wins 76–73 over La Salle
- NBA Finals – The Syracuse Nationals beat the Fort Wayne Pistons 4 games to 3 to win the NBA title
- Eurobasket 1955, the ninth European basketball championship, is won by Hungary
- March 1 – Allen Fieldhouse opens at the University of Kansas as the Jayhawks defeat Kansas State
- Bayi Basketball Club, officially founded in Ningbo, Zhejiang Province.(as predecessor for Bayi Rockets, as known well for professional basketball club in China)
- Brose Bamberg was founded in Bavaria, Germany.

== Boxing ==
- March 12 to 16 – Boxing at the 1955 Pan American Games in Mexico City
- September 21 – In New York City, Rocky Marciano knocks out the light-heavyweight champion Archie Moore in the 9th round to retain his World Heavyweight Championship belt

== Bowling ==
Nine-pin bowling

- Nine-pin bowling World Championships –
  - Men's champion: Eberhard Luther, East Germany
  - Women's champion: Franciška Erjavec, Yugoslavia
  - Men's team champion: East Germany
  - Women's team champion: East Germany

== Canadian football ==
- Grey Cup – Edmonton Eskimos won 34–19 over the Montreal Alouettes

== Cycling ==
- Giro d'Italia won by Fiorenzo Magni of Italy
- Tour de France – Louison Bobet of France
- UCI Road World Championships – Men's road race – Stan Ockers of Belgium

== Figure skating ==
- World Figure Skating Championships –
  - Men's champion: Hayes Alan Jenkins, United States
  - Ladies' champion: Tenley Albright, United States
  - Pair skating champions: Frances Dafoe & Norris Bowden, Canada
  - Ice dancing champions: Jean Westwood & Lawrence Demmy, Great Britain

== Golf ==
Men's professional

- Masters Tournament – Cary Middlecoff
- U.S. Open – Jack Fleck
- British Open – Peter Thomson
- PGA Championship – Doug Ford
- PGA Tour money leader – Julius Boros – $63,122
- Ryder Cup – United States team wins 8–4 over the British team.

Men's amateur

- British Amateur – Joe Conrad
- U.S. Amateur – Harvie Ward

Women's professional

- The LPGA launches the new LPGA Championship annual tournament.
- Women's Western Open – Patty Berg
- LPGA Championship – Beverly Hanson
- U.S. Women's Open – Fay Crocker
- Titleholders Championship – Patty Berg
- LPGA Tour money leader – Patty Berg – $16,492

== Harness racing ==
- The first Cane Pace is held at Yonkers Raceway.
- Little Brown Jug for pacers won by Quick Chief
- Cane Pace won by Quick Chief
- The United States Trotting Triple Crown races are established. Scott Frost will win the first ever crown.
  1. Hambletonian – Scott Frost
  2. Yonkers Trot – Scott Frost
  3. Kentucky Futurity – Scott Frost
- Australian Inter Dominion Harness Racing Championship –
  - Pacers: Tactician
  - Trotters: Battle Cry

== Horse racing ==
- August 31 – In one of the most famous match races in thoroughbred racing history, Nashua beats Swaps at Washington Park racetrack, Swaps only loss in nine starts as a three-year-old. Nashua's owner-breeder, William Woodward, Jr., dreams of owning a Derby winner, and plans to send Nashua to England to train toward that goal but is shot dead by his wife on October 31 before he can proceed.

Steeplechases

- Cheltenham Gold Cup – Gay Donald
- Grand National – Quare Times

Flat races

- Australia – Melbourne Cup won by Toparoa
- Canada – Queen's Plate won by Ace Marine
- France – Prix de l'Arc de Triomphe won by Ribot
- Ireland – Irish Derby Stakes won by Panaslipper
- English Triple Crown Races:
  1. 2,000 Guineas Stakes – Our Babu
  2. The Derby – Phil Drake
  3. St. Leger Stakes – Meld
- United States Triple Crown Races:
  1. Kentucky Derby – Swaps
  2. Preakness Stakes – Nashua
  3. Belmont Stakes – Nashua

== Ice hockey ==
- Art Ross Trophy as the NHL's leading scorer during the regular season: Bernie "Boom-Boom" Geoffrion, Montreal Canadiens
- Hart Memorial Trophy for the NHL's Most Valuable Player: Ted Kennedy, Toronto Maple Leafs
- Stanley Cup – Detroit Red Wings win 4 games to 3 over the Montreal Canadiens
- World Hockey Championship – Men's champion: Canada's Penticton Vees win 5–0 over the USSR
- NCAA Men's Ice Hockey Championship – University of Michigan Wolverines defeat Colorado College Tigers 5–3 in Colorado Springs

== Rugby league ==
- 1955–56 European Rugby League Championship
- 1955 New Zealand rugby league season
- 1955 NSWRFL season
- 1954–55 Northern Rugby Football League season / 1955–56 Northern Rugby Football League season

== Rugby union ==
- 61st Five Nations Championship series is shared by France and Wales

== Snooker ==
- World Snooker Championship – Fred Davis beats John Pulman 37–34

== Tennis ==
Australia

- Australian Men's Singles Championship – Ken Rosewall (Australia) defeats Lew Hoad (Australia) 9–7, 6–4, 6–4
- Australian Women's Singles Championship – Beryl Penrose Collier (Australia) defeats Thelma Coyne Long (Australia) 6–4, 6–3

England

- Wimbledon Men's Singles Championship – Tony Trabert (USA) defeats Kurt Nielsen (Denmark) 6–3, 7–5, 6–1
- Wimbledon Women's Singles Championship – Louise Brough Clapp (USA) defeats Beverly Baker Fleitz (USA) 7–5, 8–6

France

- French Men's Singles Championship – Tony Trabert (USA) defeats Sven Davidson (Sweden) 2–6, 6–1, 6–4, 6–2
- French Women's Singles Championship – Angela Mortimer (Great Britain) defeats Dorothy Head Knode (USA) 2–6, 7–5, 10–8

USA

- American Men's Singles Championship – Tony Trabert (USA) defeats Ken Rosewall (USA) 9–7, 6–3, 6–3
- American Women's Singles Championship – Doris Hart (USA) defeats Patricia Ward Hales (Great Britain) 6–4, 6–2

Davis Cup

- 1955 Davis Cup – Australia 5–0 United States at West Side Tennis Club (grass) New York City, United States

== Volleyball ==
- March 16 to 20 – Volleyball at the 1955 Pan American Games in Mexico City
  - Men's Tournament
    - Gold Medal: USA
    - Silver Medal: Mexico
    - Bronze Medal: Brazil
  - Women's Tournament
    - Gold Medal: Mexico
    - Silver Medal: USA
    - Bronze Medal: Brazil

== Multi-sport events ==
- Second Pan American Games held in Mexico City, Mexico
- Second Mediterranean Games held in Barcelona, Spain

== Awards ==
- Associated Press Male Athlete of the Year – Howard "Hopalong" Cassady, College football
- Associated Press Female Athlete of the Year – Patty Berg, LPGA golf
