= Charles W. Phellis =

American industrial executive, trap shooter, and horse breeder (1875–1957)

Personal information
- Born: Charles Waite Phellis Jr. July 15, 1875 Rosedale, Ohio, U.S.
- Died: February 1, 1957 (aged 81) Winter Park, Florida, U.S.
- Occupations: Industrial executive; Horse owner; Horse breeder

Horse racing career
- Sport: Harness racing

Honors
- United States Harness Racing Hall of Fame (1958)

Significant horses
- Spencer Scott; Hoot Mon; Miss Tilly; Emily's Pride

Charles W. Phellis (July 15, 1875 – February 1, 1957) was an American industrial executive and Standardbred horse breeder and owner. He was the breeder of the 1947 Hambletonian Stakes winner Hoot Mon and owned or bred four Hambletonian winners. He was elected to the United States Harness Racing Hall of Fame as an Immortal in 1958.

== Early life and education ==
Charles Waite Phellis Jr. was born on July 15, 1875, to Charles and Clara Guy Phellis. He was born on the family farm near Rosedale, in Madison County, Ohio. He attended Mechanicsburg High School, followed by Kenyon College. He later continued his studies at Yale University.

His father imported horses and cattle, and Phellis acquired his first horse at 18 years old. Following his graduation from college and marriage in 1893, he began building his harness racing stable.

=== Business career ===
Phellis joined E. I. du Pont de Nemours and Company in 1901, beginning a long career that included a variety of executive roles. He had served as general director of sales, general manager of pyroxylin plastics, vice president of the DuPont Rayon and Cellophane Companies, and president of Compania Mexicana de Explosives, a DuPont subsidiary. As a general sales agent and manager, he oversaw the company's offices at Huntington, West Virginia. By the early 1930s, he retired from the DuPont company. The retired industrial executive joined the New York brokerage firm Anderson and Fox as a special partner in February 1931, following the merger of A. O. Slaughter & Co. with Anderson and Fox. At the time of the merger, Phellis was a resident of New York City.

He purchased an 18-room, five-bath house on Woodside Road in Deer Park, Greenwich, Connecticut, in 1937. While maintaining his residence in Connecticut, he spent his winters in Florida.

=== Trapshooting career ===
He was active in trap shooting circles and once served as president of the American Trapshooters Association. He took part in trapshooting competitions from the early 1900s onward. He later competed in the veterans' championship for men aged 70 and over at the National Amateur Trapshooting Championships.

=== Harness racing career ===
Phellis became well known as an owner and breeder of Standardbred horses. He established a reputation as a breeder while maintaining a small band of select mares at leading stock farms in Kentucky. His horses competed on the Grand Circuit under the training and driving of Fred Egan.

Phellis privately purchased Spencer Scott as a weanling from breeder David M. Look of New York. He campaigned the colt with Fred Egan as the driver. As the owner of Spencer Scott, he won his first Hambletonian Stakes in 1940. He leased the world's champion trotting stallion to Hanover Shoe Farms in November 1941.

In addition to his racing and breeding activities, the Connecticut-based horseman was active in the Trotting Horse Club of America, the Hambletonian Society, and the Grand Circuit. He was serving as a vice president of the Grand Circuit by the late 1930s. In January 1941, he was named president of the Grand Circuit's racing operations. While president, he also organized and headed the Down East Trotting Club in 1941, which sponsored the Grand Circuit meeting at the Old Orchard Beach Kite Track in Maine. In December 1946, he retired from the position and was succeeded by Octave Blake. At the annual meeting of the United States Trotting Association, Phellis was elected an honorary vice president of the Grand Circuit.

He bred and raised Hoot Mon in 1944, whom he later sold to Castleton Farm. The Phellis-bred trotter went on to win the 1947 Hambletonian. He won another Hambletonian trophy as the owner of Miss Tilly in 1949.

=== Harness Racing Museum ===
In 1949, he was among the founders and first trustees of the organization that became the Harness Racing Museum & Hall of Fame.

== Death ==
C. W. Phellis died on February 1, 1957 in Winter Park, Florida, United States.

== Legacy ==
Following Phellis's death, Castleton Farm and Walnut Hall were among those who purchased his horses, and both later owned Emily's Pride, a Phellis-bred filly, when she won the 1958 Hambletonian.

He was elected as an Immortal of the United States Harness Racing Hall of Fame in 1958, the year after his death.
