= American Trotting Classic =

- Class: Discontinued race
- Location: Inglewood, California
- Inaugurated: 1955
- Race type: Harness race for Standardbred trotters
- Website: distance = 1 1/8 miles (1,810 metres or 9 furlongs)

Race information
- Surface: Dirt, 1 mile oval
- Track: Hollywood Park Racetrack
- Qualification: 3 years & older
- Purse: $100,000 (1981)

The American Trotting Classic at Hollywood Park Racetrack in Inglewood, California is a defunct three-race series in harness racing for Standardbred trotters aged three and older. It was run annually between 1955 and 1981 at three different racetracks with the final hosted by Hollywood Park Racetrack. During the same period, these tracks also offered the corresponding American Pacing Classic.

The race was run at a distance of one mile from 1955 through 1960, after which it was run at a mile and an eighth.

The American Trotting Classic replaced the Golden West Trot which had been contested from 1946 through 1954 under the auspices of the Western Harness Racing Association at both Santa Anita Park and at Hollywood Park.

== Historical race events ==
In 1955, Scott Frost capped off the season of racing when he took the first of his consecutive wins in the American Trotting Classic, and in both 1955 and 1956 he was voted Harness Horse of the Year. Earlier in 1955, Scott Frost had become the first horse to win the U.S. Trotting Triple Crown.

In addition to back-to-back wins by Scott Frost in 1955 and 1956 and Savoir in 1974 and 1975, two other horses have won the race twice. Fresh Yankee accomplished the feat in 1969 and again in 1971, plus Dayan in 1970 and 1972.

Hall of Fame driver/trainer Joe O'Brien won the American Trotting Classic six times, which was the most by any trainer as well as by any driver. In addition, O'Brien drove to victory in the American Pacing Classic a record four times.

== Records ==
Most wins by a driver

- 6 – Joe O'Brien (1955, 1966, 1965, 1969, 1971, 1977)

Most wins by a trainer

- 6 – Joe O'Brien (1955, 1966, 1965, 1969, 1971, 1977)

Stakes record

- 2:11 3/5 – Classical Way (1980) at 1 1/8 miles
- 1:57 3/5 – Senator Frost (1959) at 1 mile

== Winners of the American Trotting Classic ==
Year	Winner	Age	Driver	Trainer	Owner	Distance	Time	Purse
1981	Dante Jay	7	Etienne S. Desomer	Robin Clements	Desomer Stable	1 1/8 m	2:12 2/5	$123,500
1980	Classical Way	4	John F. Simpson, Jr.	John F. Simpson, Jr.	Clarence F. Gaines	1 1/8 m	2:11 3/5	$94,000
1979	Jurgy Hanover	5	Peter Haughton	Billy Haughton	Kosmos Horse Breeders, Inc.	1 1/8 m	2:12 3/5	$92,000
1978	Keystone Pioneer	6	Billy Haughton	Billy Haughton	Dorothy Haughton & Patricia Bachner	1 1/8 m	2:15 2/5	$100,800
1977	Ima Lula	4	Joe O'Brien	Joe O'Brien	Duncan A. MacDonald	1 1/8 m	2:13 4/5	$100,750
1976	Keystone Pioneer	4	Billy Haughton	Billy Haughton	Dorothy Haughton & Patricia Bachner	1 1/8 m	2:12 3/5	$109,800
1975	Savoir	7	James D. Dennis	Mel Smorra	Allwood Stables (Leonard J. & Helen R. Buck)	1 1/8 m	2:14 1/5	$104,900
1974	Savoir	6	James D. Dennis	Mel Smorra	Allwood Stables (Leonard J. & Helen R. Buck)	1 1/8 m	2:13 3/5	$109,550
1973	Elesnar	5	Percy Robillard	Percy Robillard	Argyle Farms (George Henderson)	1 1/8 m	2:16 0/0	$100,000
1972	Dayan	6	William Myer	William Myer	Adonis Stable (Murray Tobin & Eric Kirstein)	1 1/8 m	2:19 4/5	$100,000
1971	Fresh Yankee	8	Joe O'Brien	Joe O'Brien	Duncan A. MacDonald	1 1/8 m	2:20 4/5	$100,000
1970	Dayan	4	William Myer	William Myer	Adonis Stable (Murray Tobin & Eric Kirstein)	1 1/8 m	2:13 2/5	$100,000
1969	Fresh Yankee	6	Joe O'Brien	Joe O'Brien	Duncan A. MacDonald	1 1/8 m	2:15 0/0	$100,000
1968	Lady B Fast	4	William Popfinger	William Popfinger	Buttonwood Tree Farm	1 1/8 m	2:15 2/5	$75,000
1967	Grandpa Jim	5	Robert G. Farrington	Robert G. Farrington	Jim & Marie Trainor	1 1/8 m	2:13 4/5	$60,000
1966	Earl Laird	6	Robert J. Williams, Sr.	Jimmy Cruise	Joan Cruise	1 1/8 m	2:13 2/5	$50,000
1965	Armbro Flight	3	Joe O'Brien	Joe O'Brien	Armstrong Bros.	1 1/8 m	2:15 3/5	$50,000
1964	Marco Hanover	5	Richard J. Buxton	Richard J. Buxton	Garrett S. Claypool	1 1/8 m	2:14 0/0	$50,000
1963	Porterhouse	5	Earle Avery	Earle Avery	Norman S. Woolworth	1 1/8 m	2:15 0/0	$50,000
1962	Duke Rodney	4	Billy Haughton	Edward T. Wheeler	Patrick & Elisabeth DiGennaro	1 1/8 m	2:15 2/5	$50,000
1961	Air Record	5	George Sholty	George Sholty	George Sholty & Faye Ross	1 1/8 m	2:17 2/5	$80,000
1960	Silver Song	5	Howard B. Camden	Howard B. Camden	Mercury Stable Farm, Inc.	1 mile	2:01 3/5	$85,000
1959	Senator Frost	4	Richard J. Buxton	Richard J. Buxton	Wayne Galvin	1 mile	1:57 3/5	$85,000
1958	Charming Barbara	4	Billy Haughton	Billy Haughton	John Froehlich	1 mile	2:00 1/5	$75,000
1957	Galophone	5	Robert Walker	Robert Walker	William T. Maybury	1 mile	2:00 4/5	$75,000
1956	Scott Frost	4	Joe O'Brien	Joe O'Brien	S. A. Camp Farms	1 mile	1:58 3/5	$75,000
1955	Scott Frost	3	Joe O'Brien	Joe O'Brien	S. A. Camp Farms	1 mile	1:59 3/5	$75,000
