= Joe O'Brien (harness racing) =

Canadian harness racer

Personal information
- Born: June 25, 1917 Alberton, Prince Edward Island, Canada
- Died: September 29, 1984 (aged 67) Shafter, California, USA

Horse racing career
- Sport: Horse racing
- Career wins: 4,285+

Major racing wins
- Golden West Pace (1948); Reynolds Memorial 3YO Colt & Gelding Trot (1952, 1959); Walnut Hall Cup (1953, 1978); American National Trot (1954); Golden West Trot (1954); Hoosier Trot (1954, 1956, 1978); Matron Stakes Pace (1954, 1978); Saul Camp Memorial Trot (1954); U.S. Trotting Derby (1954, 1956); Walnut Hall Stud 2YO Trot (1954); Review Stakes 3yo Colt & Gelding Trot (1955); Runnymede Trot (1955); American Trotting Classic (1955, 1956, 1965, 1969, 1971, 1977)†; American Trotting Derby (1956); National Pacing Derby (1956, 1957); American National 3YO Colt & Gelding Pace (1958); Arden Downs 2YO Colt & Gelding Stakes (1958, 1979); American Pacing Classic (1959, 1963, 1975, 1979) †; Arden Downs 2YO Filly Stakes (1964, 1977, 1982); Little Brown Jugette (1964, 1965, 1976); Lou Dillon Trot (1964); Lexington Filly Stakes (1964, 1965, 1967, 1974); Reynolds Memorial 2YO Filly Trot (1964); Arden Downs 3YO Filly Stakes (1965); Reynolds Memorial 3YO Filly Trot (1965); Dexter Cup (1965); Hudson Filly Trot (1965); American National 2YO Colt & Gelding Trot (1966); Roosevelt International Trot (1966, 1970); Glen Garnsey Memorial Pace (1968, 1970, 1974); American National Open Trot (1970); Canadian Pacing Derby (1970); Galophone Trot (1970); United Nations Trot (1970); American Trotting Classic (1971); International Stallion Colt & Gelding Stake (1971, 1975); Speedy Rodney Trot (1971); Star's Pride Trot (1971); Hambletonian Oaks (1972, 1976); Maple Leaf Trot (1973, 1977); Queen City Stakes (1973, 1974); Battle of the Brandywine Pace (1975); Tattersalls Pace (1975); Bluegrass 3YO Filly Stakes (1976); Canadian Trotting Classic (1977); Hanover-Hempt Stakes (1978); Arden Downs 3YO Colt & Gelding Stakes (1979) U.S. Pacing Triple Crown wins: Little Brown Jug (1958, 1973); Cane Pace (1958, 1975) U.S. Trotting Triple Crown wins: Hambletonian Stakes (1955, 1960); Yonkers Trot (1955); Kentucky Futurity (1955, 1962, 1965, 1966, 1973) International wins: Solvallas Internationella Elitlopp (1969); Grand Prix of Bavaria (1970): † denotes record holder

Racing awards
- Maritime Provinces Leading Driver (1943-1947); Harness Tracks of America Driver of the Year (1975); Joseph Neville Memorial Award (2004)

Honours
- Canada's Sports Hall of Fame (1965); Prince Edward Island Sports Hall of Fame (1968); U.S. Harness Racing Hall of Fame (1970); Canadian Horse Racing Hall of Fame (1976); Canada's National Harness Racing O'Brien Awards

Significant horses
- Armbro Flight, Armbro Nesbit, Blaze Hanover, Diamond Hal, Dudley Patch, Fresh Yankee, Ima Lula, Melvin's Woe, Nero, Scott Frost, Shadow Wave, Steady Star
- Updated on January 14, 2017

Joseph Cyril O'Brien (June 25, 1917 – September 29, 1984) was a harness racing driver, trainer and owner who won the U.S. Trotting Triple Crown in 1955 and was inducted into both the U.S. Harness Racing Hall of Fame and the Canadian Horse Racing Hall of Fame, as well as Canada's Sports Hall of Fame. Noted for his quiet dignity and diplomacy, he is considered one of the greatest harness horsemen in history.

== Racing highlights ==
=== The early years ===
Joe O'Brien was the son of a successful Prince Edward Island farmer. His father was involved in the breeding and racing of Standardbreds and it would become part of Joe's life at an early age. He was just 16 years old when he won his first harness race at a Summerside track. After finishing school, instead of going to veterinary college as his mother wanted, in the fall of 1935 he chose to go to work as a trainer at the farm of William Latta in River Hebert, Nova Scotia. Within a few years Joe O'Brien had become a dominant force in racing in the Maritime Provinces. He led all drivers in wins for five straight years from 1943 through 1947 and at Truro Raceway won a record-shattering 11 races on a single racecard. In 1947 he led all drivers in North America with 128 wins but the United States Trotting Association did not recognize the 44 races he won in the Maritime Provinces and gave him a National ranking of 7th in the USTA standings.

=== California bound ===
During 1947 Joe O'Brien headed to Del Mar, California where before long he would be hired to drive and train for the West Coast division of Castleton Farms racing stable owned by Frances Dodge, daughter of John Dodge automobile manufacturing pioneer and co-founder of Dodge Brothers Company. O'Brien would soon gain national recognition when he drove and trained the Castleton pacer Indian Land to victory in the then rich $50,000 Golden West Pace at Hollywood Park Racetrack.

In 1951 O'Brien accepted an offer to take over as head trainer and driver for the S. A. Camp Farms, Inc. in Shafter, California, a small city he would call home for the rest of his life. After just four years with owner Sol Camp, Joe O'Brien had won numerous major races and in 1954 he drove Scott Frost to victory in a time of two minutes flat making him the first two-year-old in the world achieve such a winning time. In 1955 O'Brien and Scott Frost won the Hambletonian Stakes, the Yonkers Trot and the Kentucky Futurity giving him the United States Trotting Triple Crown. In a remarkable three years of racing, Scott Frost would be voted the 1954 United States Two-Year-Old Trotter of the Year and the 1955 and 1956 United States Harness Horse of the Year.

In 1958, again for Sol Camp, O'Brien won the Little Brown Jug with Shadow Wave. He would win that most prestigious race for pacers again in 1973 with Thurman Downing's Melvin's Woe to go along with another Hambletonian in 1960 with Sol Camp's Blaze Hanover, making it his second win in the most prestigious race for trotters.

In 1969, Joe O'Brien became the first driver in history to have won the Hambletonian and Sweden's Elitloppet. Through 2016, only John Campbell has matched that feat, doing it with Mack Lobell in 1988.

In 1963, Sol Camp retired from racing and sold his stable. Joe O'Brien was hired by J. Elgin Armstrong of the Armstrong Brothers breeding and racing operations near Brampton, Ontario for whom he notably developed the great Armbro Flight, Armbro Nesbit and Armbro Ranger.

=== Breaking the two-minute barrier worldwide ===
Competing in the 1960s and 1970s, when a winning time of less two minutes was the paragon of excellence, on October 1, 1971, Joe O'Brien drove Steady Star to a World Record of 1:52 in a time trial at The Red Mile. On May 27, 1973, at Solvalla Racetrack in Sweden, O'Brien produced the first ever sub two-minute mile in the history of European harness racing when he won the second heat of the world-famous Elitloppet with Flower Child. Over a period of nine days at the October 1970 annual Grand Circuit meeting at Lexington, Kentucky's Red Mile, O'Brien beat the two-minute mile clocking a total of 10 times. Even more remarkable, in 1975 he set a World Record by winning 44 sub-two-minute mile races and 32 two-minute mile races.

== Fresh Yankee ==
During his career Joe O'Brien trained and/or drove numerous North American Champions and Hall of Fame Standardbreds. Among them he trained and drove Triple Crown winner Scott Frost, as well as Armbro Flight to three straight Canadian Harness Horse of the Year honors. However, it was Fresh Yankee that brought him the most worldwide publicity.

A $900 yearling purchase, the brilliant mare became the first North American-bred trotter to earn $1 million. During the four years O'Brien trained Fresh Yankee for owner Duncan MacDonald she was voted the U.S. Harness Horse of the Year in 1970, the U.S. Champion Trotting Mare of the Year four times and the Canadian Horse of the Year in 1970 plus the Canadian Champion Aged Trotter a record setting six times. While regularly racing against male trotters, Fresh Yankee broke track and World Records and in 1967 became the fastest trotting mare in history with a time trial clocking of 1:57.1. Her many wins included the American Trotting Classic twice, the International Trot, the United Nations Trot, Germany's Grand Prix of Bavaria and in Sweden the Elitloppet and the International Elite Trot.

== Industry executive & O'Brien Awards program ==
Joe O'Brien was a member of the board of directors of the United States Trotting Association and served as president of the California Breeder's Association.

Joe O'Brien died of cancer at his home in Shafter, California. A few years after his passing Standardbred Canada announced they were considering a new national harness racing award program. Established in 1989, it was named the O'Brien Awards in his honor.
