= Lawrence B. Sheppard =

American businessman and harness racing executive (1897–1968)

Personal information
- Nickname: Shepp
- Born: Lawrence Baker Sheppard; December 13, 1897 Baltimore, Maryland, U.S.
- Died: February 26, 1968 (aged 70) Hanover, Pennsylvania, U.S.
- Occupation: Businessman

Horse racing career
- Sport: Harness racing

Honors
- United States Harness Racing Hall of Fame (1968)

Significant horses
- Peter Manning; Tar Heel (purchased by Sheppard, 1951)

Lawrence B. Sheppard (December 13, 1897 – February 26, 1968) was an American businessman and harness racing executive who built Hanover Shoe Farms into one of the leading Standardbred breeding farms in the United States.

== Early life and education ==
Lawrence Baker Sheppard was born in Baltimore, Maryland, United States, on December 13, 1897.

His father was Harper D. Sheppard, a nationally known shoe manufacturer and newspaper publisher. The elder Sheppard partnered with C. N. Myers in 1899 to form the Hanover Shoe Company, a successful manufacturer and seller of high-quality leather shoes. A young Lawrence Sheppard was guided and influenced by his father, also a noted amateur driver. He rode his first race as an amateur over a bush track in the Far West at 16 years old.

He graduated from Haverford College in Haverford, Pennsylvania. At age 20, he became Hanover's first aviator in 1918 after completing a six-week intensive course in aviation at the Massachusetts Institute of Technology in Cambridge. He had been a student at the University of Virginia School of Law before enlisting in the Naval Flying Corps on March 9, 1918. He underwent flight service at a naval air station on Long Island. During World War I, he served as a naval aviation pioneer for the United States Navy. After the war, he was admitted to the bar, but decided on a different career path.

== Career ==
Following his service as a naval aviator, he joined the firm of Sheppard & Myers, Inc. in 1921. By 1923, he had been elected vice president and general manager of the Hanover Shoe Company.

=== Hanover Shoe Farms ===
Still in his twenties and serving as a junior partner in the Hanover Shoe Company, L. B. Sheppard took the lead in turning Hanover Shoe Stables into Hanover Shoe Farms. He began upgrading the stable's bloodstock in 1922, acquiring some of the era's most notable racehorses, including Baron Worthy and Peter Manning. In 1926, Sheppard took another major step with the purchase of 69 horses from the estate of A. B. Coxe.

When the William Penn Circuit was formed in November 1927, Sheppard was appointed its president. In 1928, he established the Hanover Driving Club as part of the circuit, becoming its inaugural president. He drove his first professional race in 1930 at Bloomsburg, Pennsylvania, scoring a victory with two-year-old trotter Effie Hanover. He later set a world record with Dean Hanover in 1937 for the fastest three-heat performance in a race, recording times of 2:00¼, 2:00¾, and 2:00¾.

He helped establish the United States Trotting Association in 1938 and was selected as one of the vice presidents when the association was formed. He was also appointed to its board of directors.

Outside of harness racing, he was also active in local civic affairs in Hanover, Pennsylvania. He was elected president of the Hanover School Board in late 1934. He served as president until 1939 with Guy R. Goodfellow succeeding him. That year, he was elected president of the board of directors of the Hanover General Hospital, succeeding C. N. Myers.

In 1940, Sheppard succeeded his father as president of the Hanover Shoe Company, which he had founded.

He was among the first trustees of the Trotting Museum, Inc. established in 1949. He formed the corporation with E. Roland Harriman, Elbridge T. Gerry, William H. Cane, Octave Blake, Charles W. Phellis, and George Morton Levy. As part of the group of harness racing executives, Sheppard helped establish a harness horse museum and hall of fame in Goshen, New York, known as the Hall of Fame of the Trotter and now the Harness Racing Museum & Hall of Fame.

Sheppard was made a temporary president of the United States Trotting Association in July 1950 to fill a vacancy and was twice elected to the post. He hired John F. Simpson Sr. to take over as general manager of both Hanover Shoe Farm's racing and breeding interests in 1951. After serving as general manager for 25 years, he stepped down from the position due to his duties as president of the United States Trotting Association. He gained national attention in 1956, when as trotting association president he became engaged in a controversy with George P. Monaghan, New York state harness trotting commissioner, over charges of racketeer influence at New York tracks. He served as president until March 1958, when he retired after eight years. He continued in his role as director of District 8, covering Pennsylvania, New Jersey, Maryland, Delaware, and the District of Columbia.

His father and his business partner C. N. Myers had founded a daily newspaper called the Hanover Evening Sun in 1915. L. B. Sheppard spent many years as a publisher of the Evening Sun. He also served as president of The Evening Sun Co. until it was sold in 1958 to Brush-Moore Newspapers. He controlled the Sun with five other shareholders.

=== State Commissioner ===
In 1960, Governor David L. Lawrence selected him to serve as chairman of the Pennsylvania State Harness Racing Commission, which regulated pari-mutuel harness racing in Pennsylvania. He served in his role as chairman of the commission until 1963 with Governor William W. Scranton accepting his resignation.

He stepped down from the post of president of the Hanover Shoe Company Inc. on April 2, 1962. He was succeeded as president by E. S. Fitzgibbons. He was reelected chairman of the board and chairman and president of the board of Sheppard & Myers, Inc., the company's retailing corporation.

He served as vice chairman of the board of the National Bank and Trust Co. of Central Pennsylvania following the December 1964 merger of the First National Bank and Trust Co. of Hanover and National Central. He was elected head chairman of the board on January 26, 1967.

He resigned from his positions as vice president and director of the Hambletonian Society in 1966. In 1968, he was succeeded at the helm of Hanover Shoe Farms by John F. Simpson Sr.

== Death ==
L. B. Sheppard died on February 26, 1968, in Hanover, Pennsylvania, United States, at age 70.

== Legacy ==
Sheppard was awarded the Medal of Freedom by the United States Government in 1945 for his actions during World War II. In the following year, he received a Certificate of Appreciation from the War Department.

Many harness races were named in his honor. He was recognized through the Lawrence B. Sheppard Pace, a prominent race for two-year-old pacers first held at Yonkers Raceway in 1964. He was posthumously inducted into the United States Harness Racing Hall of Fame in 1968.
