= Billy Haughton =

American racehorse trainer

Personal information
- Born: November 23, 1923 Gloversville, New York, U.S.
- Died: July 15, 1986 (aged 62) Valhalla, New York, U.S.
- Occupations: Harness racing driver, trainer, owner
- Spouse: Dorothy Bischoff (m. 1950)
- Children: 5, including Peter Haughton

Horse racing career
- Sport: Horse racing
- Career wins: 4,910

Major racing wins
- Golden West Trot (1949); American Trotting Classic (1958, 1962, 1976, 1978); Dexter Cup (1966, 1967); Prix d'Été (1967); Adios Pace (1967, 1969, 1974); Glen Garnsey Memorial Pace (1969, 1976); American Pacing Classic (1974); Little Brown Jugette (1974); Canadian Trotting Classic (1976, 1986); Maple Leaf Trot (1979); Queen City Pace (1980); Woodrow Wilson Pace (1981) Breeders Crown wins: Breeders Crown 3YO Filly Pace (1984); Breeders Crown 3YO Colt & Gelding Pace (1985); Breeders Crown 2YO Filly Pace (1985) U.S. Pacing Triple Crown wins: Little Brown Jug (1955, 1964, 1968, 1969, 1974); Cane Pace (1955, 1967, 1968); Messenger Stakes (1956, 1967, 1968, 1972, 1974, 1975, 1976) U.S. Trotting Triple Crown wins: Hambletonian Stakes (1974, 1976, 1977, 1980, 1985) Yonkers Trot (1976, 1977)

Racing awards
- United States Leading Driver by Earnings (1952-59, 1963, 1965, 1967-68)

Honours
- United States Harness Racing Hall of Fame (1968); Little Brown Jug Wall of Fame (1986); William R. Haughton Memorial Pace

Significant horses
- Armbro Omaha, Green Speed, Handle With Care, Laverne Hanover, Nihilator, Romulus Hanover, Rum Customer, Silent Majority

William Robert (Billy) Haughton (November 23, 1923 – July 15, 1986) was an American harness driver and trainer. He was one of only three drivers to win the Hambletonian four times, the only one to win the Little Brown Jug five times, and the only one to win the Messenger Stakes seven times. With a career record of 4,910 wins and about $40 million in earnings, he was first in annual winnings 12 times – 1952–59, 1963, 1965, 1967, and 1968 – and in heats won from 1953 to 1958.

== Early life and career ==
Born in Gloversville, New York, Haughton came from a farming background, where he competed in fairground races before coming into harness driving. In the early 1960s, he started developing a stable of his own. His best horses were Rum Customer that won the pacing Triple Crown in 1968, Green Speed that was named Harness Horse of the Year in 1977, and Nihilator that was named Harness Horse of the Year for 1985. With his Meadow Paige, Haughton paced a world record 1:55.2-minute mile in a time trial at Lexington in 1967.

== Personal life and death ==
Haughton was married to Dorothy Bischoff, and together they had five children, including Peter, who was also a harness driver. His son Peter, died in an automobile accident in East Rutherford, New Jersey on January 25, 1980.

On July 15, 1986, Haughton died in Valhalla, New York, from head injuries sustained at Yonkers Raceway at the age of 62.

His wife Dorothy died on March 31, 2019, at her home in Newfields, New Hampshire at the age of 87.
