= Glidemaster =

American Standardbred racehorse

- Breed: Standardbred
- Sire: Yankee Glide
- Dam: Cressida Hanover
- Damsire: Mr. Lavec
- Sex: Stallion
- Foaled: 2003
- Country: United States
- Color: Brown
- Trainer: Blair Burgess

Awards
- United States Harness Horse of the Year (2006)

Glidemaster is a Standardbred trotter who was named the 2006 United States Harness Horse of the Year by the United States Harness Writers Association. He is a 2003 brown stallion by Yankee Glide out of Cressida Hanover by Mr Lavec.

== Career ==
Trainer Blair Burgess purchased Glidemaster as a yearling for $10,000 on the opening night of the 2004 Tattersalls sale. The ownership included partnerships with Blair's father, Robert Burgess, wife, Karin Olsson-Burgess and Marsha Cohen.

In September 2005 after winning three of four of his freshman starts, a portion of Glidemaster was sold to his Breeder, Brittany Farms.

Glidemaster was the fifth Canadian-owned horse to win the Hambletonian Stakes in 83 Years.

In the week prior to the elimination race of the Hambletonian, Glidemaster pulled a horseshoe loose in the stall and then stepped on a nail which punctured his foot. This injury rendered the horse unsound for racing at that time. Extensive care of the horse by care taker and co-owner Karin Olsson-Burgess and Trainer Blair Burgess had Glidemaster ready to race just in time for the elimination - in which he finished second, a placing good enough to qualify for and win the final the following week.

Glidemaster was the first trotter since 1972 to win the Trotting Triple Crown on the traditional format of two mile tracks, The Hambletonian] at The Meadowlands and the Kentucky Futurity at The Red Mile and a half mile track, the Yonkers Trot at Yonkers Raceway.

Glidemaster's 2006 Hambletonian Victory was the second for Trainer Blair Burgess who had won the race previously in 2003 with Amigo Hall in one of the biggest upset in the history of the race at 27-1.

He finished his racing career as the fastest trotter of 2006 with a mark of 1:51.1, achieved ranking as the sport's leading single-season money-winning totter of all time and had a total earnings of $1,968,023.

As a stallion, Glidemaster's offspring includes Blue Porsche, who was named Canada's Two Year Old Trotter of the Year in 2010. Other successful horses sired by Glidemaster are Breeders Crown winner Maven, and Bluegrass Stakes winner Punxsutawney.

Glidemaster is currently standing in Delaware at Winbak Farm.
