= American Pacing Classic =

- Class: Discontinued
- Location: Inglewood, California
- Inaugurated: 1955; 71 years ago
- Race type: Harness race for standardbred pacers

Race information
- Distance: 1 1/8 miles (1,810 metres, 9 furlongs)
- Surface: Dirt, 1/2-mile oval
- Track: Hollywood Park Racetrack
- Qualification: 3 years & older
- Purse: $288,000 (1981)

The American Pacing Classic is a defunct three-race series in harness racing for Standardbred pacers aged three and older. It was run annually between 1955 and 1981 at three different racetracks with the final hosted by Hollywood Park Racetrack in Inglewood, California. During the same period, these tracks also offered the corresponding American Trotting Classic.

The American Pacing Classic replaced the Golden West Pace which had been run from 1946 through 1954 under the auspices of the Western Harness Racing Association with races at both Santa Anita Park and Hollywood Park.

== Historical race events ==
In the inaugural American Pacing Classic series, Hillsota, Diamond Hal and Times Square each won a heat of the Pacing Classic in the identical time of 1:59 flat. As a result, Hillsota and Times Square were awarded a tie for the series based on their final standing in a summary of the three heats.

Los Alamitos Race Course created a short-lived one mile race they called the American Pacing Classic which was run from 1990 to 1992.

== Records ==
Most wins by a driver

- 4 – Joe O'Brien (1959, 1963, 1975, 1979)

Most wins by a trainer

- 3 – Stanley Dancer (1965, 1971, 1972)

Stakes record

- 2:07 3/5 – Niatross (1980) at 1 1/8 miles
- 1:55 3/5 – Adios Butler (1960) at 1 mile

== Winners of the American Pacing Classic ==
Year	Winner	Age	Driver	Trainer	Owner	Dist. (Miles)	Time	Purse
1981	Genghis Khan	4	Sheldon Goudreau	Eddie Cobb	Eddie Cobb, Nevacal Stable, Jet Star Farms	1 1/8 m	2:09 0/0	$288,000
1980	Niatross	3	Clint Galbraith	Clint Galbraith	Niatross Syndicate	1 1/8 m	2:07 3/5	$98,500
1979	Flight Director	4	Joe O'Brien	Joe O'Brien	Thurman S. Downing	1 1/8 m		$150,000
1978	Rambling Willie	8	Robert G. Farrington	Robert G. Farrington	Farrington Stable Inc.	1 1/8 m		$110,750
1977	Le Baron Rouge	5	Bernard Gervais	Bernard Gervais	Paul-Henri Lavoie	1 1/8 m	2:10 3/5	$110,250
1976	Oil Burner	3	Ben Webster	Charlie Wingate	William Brooks & Ben Webster	1 1/8 m	2:10 0/0	$113,750
1975	Young Quinn	6	Joe O'Brien	Charlie Hunter	Bud & Des Baynes	1 1/8 m	2:12 4/5	$100,000
1974	Keystone Smartie	4	Peter Haughton	Billy Haughton	D.D.M Stable	1 1/8 m	2:11 1/5	$113,350
1973	Invincible Shadow	4	Jim Miller	Jim Miller	John F. Graham	1 1/8 m	2:11 3/5	$114,100
1972	Albatross	4	Stanley Dancer	Stanley Dancer	Amicable Stable	1 1/8 m	2:11 3/5	$100,000
1971	Albatross	3	Stanley Dancer	Stanley Dancer	Amicable Stable	1 1/8 m	2:13 4/5	$100,000
1970	Laverne Hanover	4	George Sholty	Billy Haughton	Thomas W. Murphy, Jr.	1 1/8 m	2:14 4/5	$100,000
1969	Overcall	6	Del Insko	Del Insko	Helen R. Buck	1 1/8 m	2:11 1/5	$100,000
1968	Overcall	5	Del Insko	Del Insko	Helen R. Buck	1 1/8 m	2:15 3/5	$75,000
1967	Easy Prom	5	Robert G. Farrington	Robert G. Farrington	Farrington Stables & Arnold Cattle Co.	1 1/8 m	2:13 3/5	$60,000
1966	True Duane	3	Norman "Chris" Boring	Leon Boring	Richard Oldfield	1 1/8 m	2:09 1/5	$50,000
1965	Cardigan Bay	9	Edward T. Wheeler	Stanley Dancer	Irving W. Berkemeyer, Lawrence Slobody, et al.	1 1/8 m	2:11 3/5	$50,000
1964	Meadow Skipper	4	Earle Avery	Earle Avery	Norman S. Woolworth	1 1/8 m	2:11 3/5	$50,000
1963	Gamecock	4	Joe O'Brien	John F. Simpson Sr.	Lawrence B. Sheppard	1 1/8 m	2:13 3/5	$50,000
1962	Irvin Paul	5	Charles King	Charles King	Charles King & Abraham Wilsker	1 1/8 m	2:11 1/5	$50,000
1961	Adios Butler	5	Paige H. West	Paige H. West	Paige H. West & Angelo Pellillo	1 1/8 m	2:11 1/5	$80,000
1960	Adios Butler	4	Clint Hodgins	Paige H. West	Paige H. West & Angelo Pellillo	1 m	1:55 3/5	$75,000
1959	Sunbelle	4	Joe O'Brien	Joe O'Brien	S. A. Camp Farms, Inc.	1 m	1:57 2/5	$75,000
1958	Gold Worthy	5	Curly Smart	Curly Smart	Dr. A. B. Thompson	1 m	1:57 1/5	$75,000
1957	Widower Creed	4	Jimmy Wingfield	Jimmy Wingfield	Tom Loss	1 m	1:58 3/5	$75,000
1956	Dotties Pick	4	Delvin Miller	Delvin Miller	J. Elgin & Charles E. Armstrong	1 m	1:57 4/5	$75,000
1955	Times Square	5	McKinley Kirk	McKinley Kirk	Eddie Kirk	1 m	1:59 0/0	$75,000
1955	Hillsota	5	Earle Avery	Earle Avery	Clearview Stables	1 m	1:59 0/0	$75,000
