= Armbro Flight =

Canadian Standardbred racehorse

- Sire: Stars Pride
- Grandsire: Worthy Boy
- Dam: Helicopter
- Damsire: Hoot Mon
- Sex: Mare
- Foaled: 1962
- Country: Canada
- Breeder: Armstrong Bros.
- Owner: Armstrong Bros.
- Trainer: Joe O'Brien
- Record: 65: 51 wins
- Earnings: $493,602

Major wins
- Roosevelt International Trot (1966) U.S. Trotting Triple Crown wins: Kentucky Futurity (1965)

Awards
- Canadian Trotting Horse of the Year (1964, 1965, 1966)

Honors
- Canadian Horse Racing Hall of Fame (1976); United States Racing Hall of Fame (1998); Canadian Commemorative Stamp (1999)
- Last updated on November 22, 2016

Armbro Flight (1962–1995) was a champion trotting mare bred by the Armstrong Brothers Farm of J. Elgin, Ted and Charles Armstrong in Brampton, Ontario, Canada. She established five world records in the 1960s. She was honored by Canada Post in 1999 with the issuance of a commemorative postage stamp along with Northern Dancer. One of North America's greatest trotting mares of the 1960s, Armbro Flight was inducted into the Canadian Horse Racing Hall of Fame in 1976 and into the United States Racing Hall of Fame in 1998.
