= Scott Frost (disambiguation) =

Scott Frost (born 1975) is an American football coach and former player.

Scott Frost may also refer to:

- Scott Frost (writer), American screenwriter and novelist
- E. Scott Frost (born 1962), judge in Texas
- Scott Frost (The Leftovers), fictional character
- Scott Frost (horse) (1952–1983), American Standardbred trotter
