= Hoot Mon =

American Standardbred racehorse (1944–1965)

- Breed: Standardbred
- Sire: Scotland
- Grandsire: Peter Scott
- Dam: Missey
- Damsire: Guy Abbey
- Sex: Stallion
- Foaled: 1944
- Died: August 2, 1965 (aged 20–21)
- Country: United States
- Color: Black
- Breeder: Charles W. Phellis
- Owner: Castleton Farm
- Trainer: Fred Egan; Sep Palin
- Earnings: $74,950

Major wins
- Hambletonian Stakes (1947); Kentucky Futurity (1947)

Honours
- United States Harness Racing Hall of Fame (1959)

Hoot Mon (1944 – August 2, 1965), also known as the Hambletonian Sire, was an American Standardbred trotting horse and sire. He won the Hambletonian Stakes and Kentucky Futurity in 1947. He was elected to the Hall of Immortals of the Harness Racing Museum & Hall of Fame in 1959.

== Background ==
Hoot Mon was bred by Charles W. Phellis and foaled in 1944. He was a son of Scotland out of the unraced mare Missey, whose sire was Guy Abbey. Scotland, himself a sub-two-minute trotter, was a son of Peter Scott and became an influential sire of both trotters and pacers.

== Racing career ==
=== Two-year-old season ===
Hoot Mon was initially developed by trainer Fred Egan. Hoot Mon made his racing debut at the Kite Track in Maine. He finished second to Rodney in the 1946 Tompkins Memorial before winning the American Stake at Milwaukee. He set a two-year-old trotting record at DuQuoin State Fairgrounds Racetrack in August 1946, winning the second heat of the fair's two-year-old stake in 2:05.3. His performances prompted Castleton Farm to purchase him from C. W. Phellis for $50,000. On August 27, 1946, he came into the ownership of Frances Dodge of Rochester, Michigan, operator of Castleton Farm. It was the highest price paid for a two-year-old horse since the early 1920s.

He was driven by Fred Egan in the $17,000 Horseman Stake for two-year-old trotters on September 5, 1946. He continued his two-year-old campaign with additional stakes success and later defeated his rival Rodney at Lexington. On September 26, 1946, the Castleton Farm-owned colt captured the Lexington Stake in straight heats, recording a mile in 2:03 1/2.

=== Three-year-old season ===
After the sale to Castleton, Hoot Mon joined the stable of Sep Palin. Hoot Mon began his three-year-old season in California at Hollywood Park Racetrack where he won an early $3,000 stake on May 3, 1947. While being shipped to the Grand Circuit meeting at Fort Miami Raceway in June, he injured an ankle and became lame. X-rays found only a minor injury, allowing him to resume light training by mid-June. He made only one appearance that month, finishing second to Rodney on June 20, 1947, before another layoff.

Trainer Sep Palin brought Hoot Mon back for the 1947 Hambletonian Stakes at Good Time Park in Goshen, New York. Rodney won the opening heat, with Hoot Mon finishing second. Hoot Mon then defeated Rodney by two lengths in the second heat, trotting the mile in 2:00. It was the first two-minute mile recorded in the history of the Hambletonian. In addition to setting a Hambletonian record, the time equalled Greyhound's mark for the fastest mile ever recorded in a trotting race. Hoot Mon went on to win the deciding heat to capture the race.

Following the Hambletonian, Hoot Mon won the American Stake, the Du Quoin Stake, and the $36,905 Kentucky Futurity. He ended his racing career with earnings of $74,950 and a lifetime mark of 2:00.

== Stud record ==
In 1948, Hoot Mon was purchased by Hanover Shoe Farms for $50,000 and retired to stud at the farm in Hanover, Pennsylvania. He remained there throughout his breeding career. The first crop sired by Hoot Mon began competing in 1952. Eleven of his offspring became race winners, seven of them taking records of 2:10 or faster, while the crop earned a combined $132,667.58. The performance established a record for the first crop of a trotting stallion.

Hoot Mon's reputation as a sire increased substantially when his daughter Helicopter won the 1953 Hambletonian. The victory made Hoot Mon the first winner of the race to later sire a Hambletonian winner. Three additional sons or daughters of Hoot Mon subsequently won the race: Scott Frost in 1955, Blaze Hanover in 1960, and A.C.'s Viking in 1962. His four Hambletonian winners led to his being known as the "Hambletonian Sire". Scotland, Hoot Mon's sire, produced more Hambletonian winners, with five to Hoot Mon's four. His influence in the Hambletonian Stakes also extended through his daughters. Arpege, a daughter of Hoot Mon, produced Ayres, winner of the 1964 Hambletonian.

== Death and legacy ==
Hoot Mon died at Hanover Shoe Farms on August 2, 1965, at 21 years old.

He had been elected to the Hall of Immortals of the United States Harness Racing Hall of Fame in 1959.

== Pedigree ==
Hoot Mon was sired by Scotland, a son of Peter Scott and Roya McKinney. Scotland recorded a mile in 1:59¼ and later became the sire of 160 trotters and 114 pacers. Hoot Mon's dam, Missey, was an unraced daughter of Guy Abbey.
