= Trotting Horse Club of America =

American harness racing organization

- Successor: United States Trotting Association
- Formation: 1927
- Founder: E. Roland Harriman
- Type: Harness racing organization
- Headquarters: United States
- Chairman: E. Roland Harriman
- First vice-chairman: William H. Cane
- Treasurer: David M. Look

The Trotting Horse Club of America was an American organization established in 1927 to promote the breeding of Standardbred horses and advance harness racing in the United States.

== History ==
=== Founding and early years ===
In January 1927, E. Roland Harriman publicly announced the establishment of the Trotting Club of America at the New England Horsemen's Day at Springfield, Massachusetts.

First known as the Trotting Club of America, the association was formally organized during the Grand Circuit meeting at Goshen, New York in August 1927. E. R. Harriman served as chairman, with William H. Cane as first vice-chairman and Dr. Ogden Edwards as second vice-chairman. Other officers included John L. Dodge, secretary, and David M. Look, treasurer. The stewards were Lawrence B. Sheppard, Fred F. Field, Thomas W. Murphy, and A. H. Cosden. At its formation, the club appointed a 30-member board of directors.

=== American Trotting Register Association ===
The Trotting Horse Club set out to promote uniform racing rules, revive public interest in harness racing, and restore the sport's official records. After the American Trotting Register Association discontinued publication of the Year Book and Register in 1923, the sport lacked an organization responsible for maintaining official horse registrations and race records. In its first move, the Trotting Horse Club of America acquired the stock of the American Trotting Register Association and took control of its official records and publications. The club revived the two publications and began publishing information on entry fees, dates, and conditions for upcoming races at tracks throughout the country. The racing records were brought up to date, certificates promptly issued, and racing results quickly published. Its founders believed that a standardized system would improve the administration of harness racing and contribute to its development. The organization was described as an effort to improve the sport through its influence rather than by directly governing its conduct.

=== Grand Circuit ===
The newly formed association established a $150,000 treasury to support the future of the Grand Circuit. In 1929, the Trotting Horse Club of America intervened to help preserve the Grand Circuit, which was facing significant organizational and financial difficulties. The club became a major financial supporter of the circuit, assisting tracks in resuming operations and subsidizing their meetings. At the beginning of the year, the Trotting Horse Club of America partnered with local horsemen to return the Grand Circuit to Hartford, Connecticut, scheduling a minimum one-week visit at Charter Oak Park to begin on August 12, 1929. Club members W. H. Cane, E. R. Harriman, D. M. Look, W. N. Reynolds, L. B. Sheppard, W. H. L. McCourtie, E. J. Baker, and W. M. Wright provided financial support to keep Kalamazoo, Michigan on the Grand Circuit in 1930. Following the withdrawal of North Randall and Hartford, the club focused on stabilizing the remaining circuit.

The Trotting Horse Club of America introduced four trotting handicaps, collectively known as the Nationals, during the summer of 1931. The club also established a series of colt stakes named after four of the country's largest trotting horse farms, the Castleton Farm, Calumet Farm, Walnut Hall Farm, and Hanover Shoe Farms stakes. A merger between the Trotting Horse Club of America and the American Trotting Horse Breeders' Association took place in November 1932. The merger consolidated the sponsorship of six major stakes including the Champion Stallion Stakes, Matron Stakes, American Futurity, and National Futurities. David M. Look, a member of the Trotting Horse Club, was serving as president of the breeders' association at the time.

In February 1933, the club and the American Register Association announced plans for the publication of Hoof Beats, which was issued from their offices.

The club appointed William H. Cane as czar of the Grand Circuit in 1934. Among Cane's first initiatives was the formation of a committee with H. H. Knight and J. J. Mooney, which supported the Cleveland and Toledo franchises and expanded the circuit to Toronto.

Efforts to improve the starting of trotting and pacing races began in late 1936. Following Harriman's re-election as chairman, he appointed J. I. Lyle, C. W. Phellis, and L. B. Sheppard to a committee tasked with revising the rules governing starts. The new starting rules formulated by the three-member committee were adopted by the Grand Circuit ahead of the 1937 season.

While the Trotting Horse Club of America drew its membership from harness racing owners and breeders, it also included notable figures from other equestrian sports. At its November 1936 meeting, the club elected 16 members, including several of the United States' top polo players who had crossed over into harness racing. Notable inductees included Elbridge Gerry Sr., William Post, Seymour H. Knox, and Dunbar Bostwick, the latter of whom also served as an executive committee member and steward.

=== Later years ===
Between 1927 and 1938, the club spent more than $500,000 promoting and developing harness racing throughout the United States. In 1938, its president, E. R. Harriman, brought together representatives of the sport in Indianapolis. The conference resulted in the establishment of the United States Trotting Association (USTA), which consolidated the functions of the existing national governing bodies. When the USTA was formed, the Trotting Horse Club of America transferred the affairs of the American Trotting Register Association to it, bringing the administration of the sport under one organization.

Following the merger, the Trotting Horse Club of America continued to operate as a national organization with over 350 members. Its primary activity was sponsoring stakes races, mainly at Grand Circuit meetings. The club expanded the Grand Circuit program in 1940 with 50 new stakes and events, intended to provide additional opportunities for juvenile horses and restore all-aged racing to the circuit. The Coaching Club Trotting Oaks was established by the Trotting Horse Club in 1941 as a $7,000 race restricted to three-year-old fillies. In November 1951, the club introduced the Breeders' Filly Stakes, assuming responsibility for the series' administration and promotion across six harness racing tracks between New York and Missouri. The Hambletonian Society later assumed promotion and sponsorship of all Trotting Horse Club of America stakes in 1961.

The organization also sponsored literature intended to promote harness racing. The Trotting Horse Club of America commissioned John L. Hervey to author the book The American Trotter in 1947.

=== Harness Horse of the Year ===
An annual poll of newspaper and radio reporters of harness horse events was conducted by the Trotting Horse Club of America for the nomination of the "Harness Horse of the Year". At the suggestion of club president E. R. Harriman, the first annual polls were sponsored in 1947, with voting conducted by 50 sports editors, harness racing writers, and radio commentators. The polls were conducted with the co-operation of the United States Harness Writers Association.

=== Hall of Fame of the Trotter ===
Concerns about the disappearance of historical artifacts prompted members of the Trotting Horse Club of America to discuss the creation of a museum and hall of fame around 1947. The club's extensive collection formed the foundation of the museum's earliest collection of trotting memorabilia and its initial exhibits. Originally known as the Hall of Fame of the Trotter, it later became known as the Harness Racing Museum & Hall of Fame.
