= David M. Look =

American businessman and horse breeder (1863–1945)

Personal information
- Born: David Millard Look; 1863 Clayville, New York, U.S.
- Died: June 21, 1945 (aged 81–82) New York City, New York, U.S.
- Occupations: Businessman; horse breeder

Horse racing career
- Sport: Harness racing

Major racing wins
- Hambletonian Stakes (1928)

Honors
- United States Harness Racing Hall of Fame (1958)

Significant horses
- Bingen; Spencer; Spencer Scott; Emily Ellen

David M. Look (1863 – June 21, 1945) was an American businessman, horse breeder, and harness racing owner who developed Castleton Farm into a prominent Standardbred breeding operation. He bred several notable trotters, including Spencer, Spencer Scott, and Emily Ellen, and served as an officer of the Trotting Horse Club of America and the Grand Circuit.

== Early life and education ==
David Millard Look was born in 1863, in Clayville, New York, United States. He was born into a wealthy family. He was the son of Samuel J. and Jennie Millard Look. His family moved to Louisville, Kentucky, during his youth, and he was educated at private schools in the city. He graduated from Princeton University in 1884, where he had captained the varsity baseball team and managed the football team.

== Career ==
=== Business career ===
His business career began at the dry goods store operated by Alexander Turney Stewart in New York City. He made a salary of $25 a month. Within two years' time, he resigned from his position at A. T. Stewart & Co. He soon entered the employment of James Talcott and his New York City dry goods commission house. In 1890, he partnered with Talcott, who then owned several New England woolen mills.

Look was appointed an assignee of Raphael & Lewenberg, overseeing the sale of the failed Boston clothing manufacturer's stock at a New York auction in November 1890.

He was elected as a member of the Chamber of Commerce of the State of New York in January 1894. In 1895, Look was among the incorporators and first directors of the Merchants' Safe Deposit Company, which was established at the Wool Exchange Building in New York City. During the summer of 1897, he was elected a director of the Tradesmen's National Bank, succeeding Dr. John G. Zabriskie. Following the reorganization of the New York Wool Exchange on November 10, 1898, he was named its vice president, as the Tradesmen's National Bank assumed control of the exchange.

While associated with Talcott's dry goods firm, he was promoted to manage its woolen department around 1899. He later retired from the firm of James R. Talcott & Co. in 1912. Following his retirement, he divided his time between his stock farm and his homes in New York and Greenwich, Connecticut. He had also served as an adviser to the firm of Moore & Schley.

=== Harness racing career ===
He developed an interest in Standardbred horses after completing his education at Princeton. He established connections in breeding circles and had two horses trained at Magnolia Farm in Lyndon, Kentucky during the summer of 1900. During the early 1900s, he became a regular consignor at public horse sales in Lexington, offering horses at various auctions.

Look first established himself as an harness horse owner and breeder on a small scale. His stable included numerous successful performers on the Grand Circuit, many of them bred by him. He bred and raised Emily Ellen, a noted daughter of Todd, and won his first major stakes success in 1910 when the three-year-old mare won the Horsemen's Futurity at Detroit. In 1910, he acquired the two-year-old Miss Stokes, a daughter of Peter the Great, for approximately $20,000. In March of the following year, he purchased her full brother, the ten-month-old Mr. Stokes, for $8,000, a price reported as a record transaction for a yearling trotter. He purchased the colt from W. E. D. Stokes, proprietor of the Patchen Wilkes Stock Farm, near Lexington. The transactions were arranged through Lon McDonald, who was associated with Look's stable. He also owned several highly bred mares. He gradually assembled a high-quality group of Standardbreds with the intention of establishing his own breeding operation and producing horses for racing.

In May 1911, the New York millionaire joined an 11-member syndicate led by Edward A. Tipton that acquired controlling stock in the Kentucky Trotting Horse Breeders' Association, owners of the Lexington track.

=== Castleton Farm ===
As Lexington, Kentucky emerged as a major center for trotting-horse breeding and training, he was among the owners and breeders acquiring land in and around the area, for their operations. In November 1911, Look purchased Castleton Farm from James R. Keene, acquiring a 1,070-acre property, with numerous buildings on what was described as some of the state's best bluegrass land. The farm property, purchased from Keene for $225,000, was converted to a Standardbred breeding establishment.

Look became active in the breeding and racing of trotters. The acquisition of Castleton Farm allowed him to expand his breeding and racing operation. He engaged Lon McDonald as trainer in December 1911, ahead of the 1912 season at the newly established Castleton Farm. He acquired Bingen, a renowned stallion, in March 1912. He had purchased William Bradley's breeding stock in Raritan, New Jersey, and moved Bingen to his farm in Lexington. The lot of 49 also included the remaining yearlings by Guy Axworthy and Bingen, the Hackney stallion Oxford Lad, and 34 broodmares from Bradley's Ardmaer Farm, costing roughly $250,000.

Look was nominated as the first president of the American Association of Trotting Horse Breeders after its establishment in 1920.

Under his ownership, Castleton Farm produced several prominent horses, including the trotters Spencer and Spencer Scott. Spencer, a bay colt bred by Look, won the 1928 Hambletonian Stakes, then worth $66,000. He also won the Kentucky Futurity for three-year-old trotters. When Look retired Spencer to stud, his first crop included Spencer McElwyn.

By the early 1930s, his son Samuel M. Look had taken over management of Castleton Farm and was residing there.

=== Racing administration ===
Look was involved in the administration and promotion of the sport of harness racing in addition to breeding and owning horses. He served as an officer of the Trotting Horse Club of America and the Grand Circuit.

== Death ==
David M. Look died on June 21, 1945, in New York City, at the Union Club of the City of New York.

== Legacy ==
Look served as a director of the Presbyterian Hospital's board for 50 years.

He was recognized for his contributions as an owner and breeder and was posthumously elected to the United States Harness Racing Hall of Fame in 1958.
