= Rigby Park =

American harness racing track

- Location: South Portland, Maine
- Date opened: 1893
- Date closed: 1899
- Race type: Harness racing

Rigby Park was an American harness racing track in South Portland, Maine, which was open from 1893 to 1899. It was torn down in 1922 and replaced by the Rigby Yard, Maine's busiest rail yard.

== Beginnings ==
In 1891, New England trotting horse owners, who had desired for many years to race in Maine, began working on establishing a track in the state. After being unable to find a suitable location in Portland, Maine, the focus turned to Old Orchard Beach, Maine, which believed a horse track would contribute to its success as a resort town. On December 29, 1891, the directors of the Mile Track Association of Maine held a meeting to discuss the proposed track and the vast majority of members opposed it, believing that the season would be too short and being so close to the ocean would be dangerous to the horses' cooling-off process. As a result of the inability to agree on a location, one faction of horsemen, led by John F. Haines and M. F. Porter began work on the Old Orchard Beach Kite Track while the Mile Track Association worked on a track in Portland.

== Racing ==
Rigby Park opened in 1893. The track was one of the fastest in the country and management invested a large sum in purses to attract the top horses, however attendance was not strong. In 1895, track management convinced the New England Agricultural Society to hold the New England Fair at Rigby. 1896 saw increased attendance due to new streetcar lines from Portland to the track and manager Horace Frank Farnham's work to improve spectator experience, which included hiring a band to perform during breaks and providing free admission to women. On August 21, 1896, Joe Patchen set a world record by running a mile in 2:03.0. In 1898, Rigby Park was added to the Grand Circuit schedule.

== Demise ==
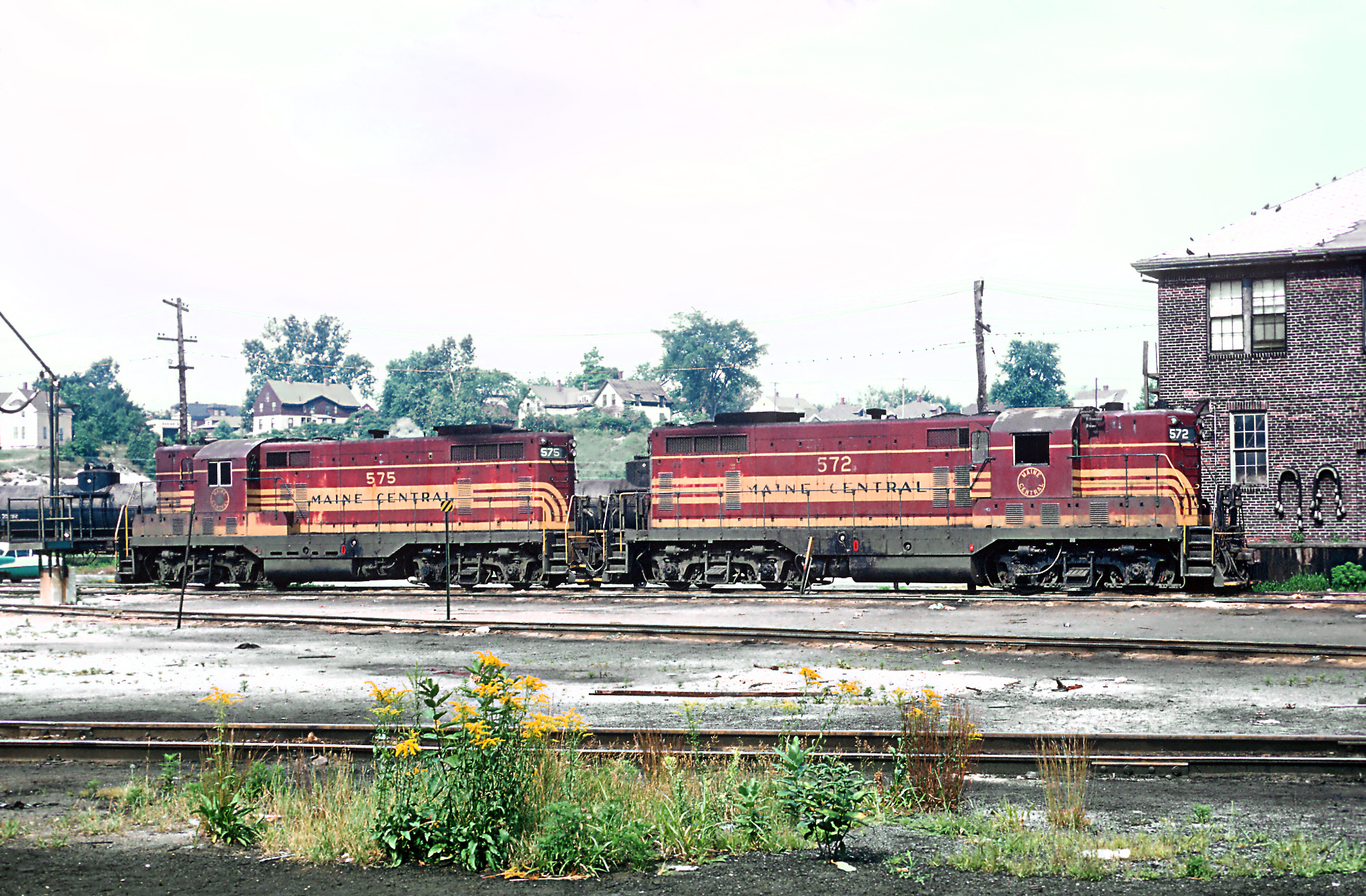
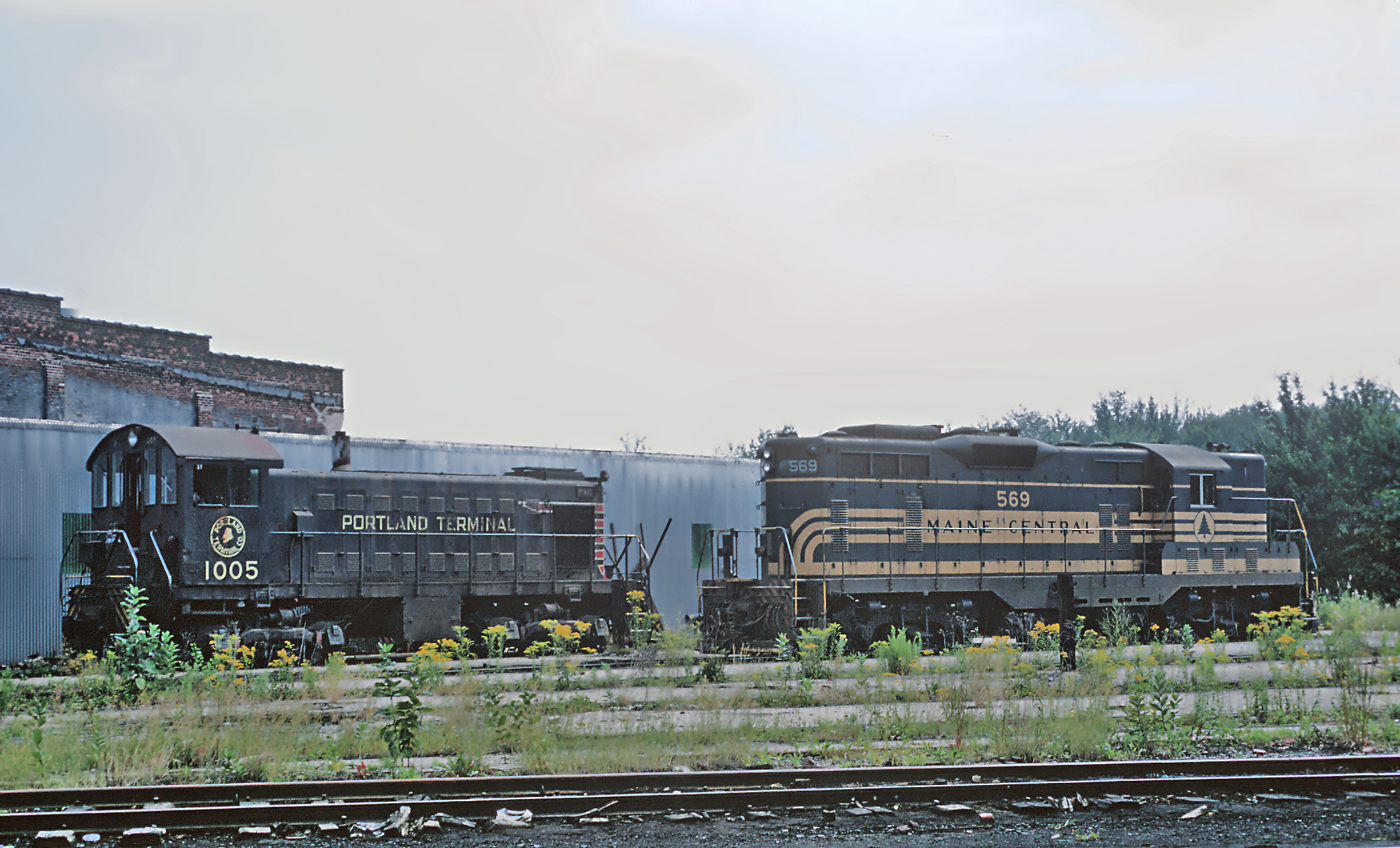
Maine Central Railroad Company trains at Rigby Yard on August 4, 1968

Rigby's 1897 meets were poorly attended and that year's New England Fair did not reach its expected profit. On November 28, 1897, Farnham retired as manager of Rigby Park and the New England Fair. He was succeeded by Alonzo Libby. Unlike Farnham, who had complete control over the Mile Track Association, Libby ceded some responsibility to the executive committee and the track superintendent.

In February 1898, The Boston Globe described Rigby as a good track that had "been about as poorly managed as any in the country" due to a history of inexperienced managers and the lack of a general supervisor. The July 1898 meet was called off due to a lack of entries and the September Grand Circuit meet was so poorly attended that The Boston Globe described it as "the lightest in the history of the circuit" and added that Portland should be removed from the schedule because of it. In January 1899 it was reported that Rigby management had yet to pay the premiums awarded at the New England Fair four months prior. The New England Agricultural Society elected not to hold a New England Fair in 1899. The 1899 racing meet was particularly disastrous and as a result the track's major financial backers, W. F. Milliken and George Burnham, pulled their support.

== Rigby Yard ==
The track remained idle until 1922, when it was purchased by the Portland Terminal Company. The Portland Terminal Company constructed a roundhouse on, and moved all of its terminal buildings, repair shops, and sheds to, the 130-acre property. The Rigby Yard became the busiest New England rail yard north of Boston as car storage and locomotive servicing facilities were eliminated from older yards in Portland. Maine Central and Boston & Maine freight trains originated or terminated in Rigby Yard. It became the interchange point for Sanford and Eastern trains.
