= Windsong's Legacy =

American Standardbred racehorse

- Breed: Standardbred
- Sire: Conway Hall
- Grandsire: Garland Lobell
- Sex: Stallion
- Foaled: 2001
- Trainer: Trond Smedshammer

Windsong's Legacy was a Standardbred trotting horse who won the Triple Crown of Harness Racing for Trotters in 2004, capturing the Hambletonian, Yonkers Trot and Kentucky Futurity titles. The horse was trained and driven by Trond Smedshammer. He became the first trotter since Super Bowl in 1972 to win the Triple Crown. He died early in 2008 from heart failure at the age of seven, after siring three foal crops.
