= Golden West Pace =

- Class: Discontinued
- Location: Arcadia & Inglewood, California
- Inaugurated: 1946
- Race type: Harness race for standardbred pacers

Race information
- Distance: 1 3/16 miles (1,911 metres or 9.5 furlongs)
- Surface: Dirt, 1/2-mile oval (Santa Anita Park) & 1-mile oval (Hollywood Park)
- Track: Santa Anita Park & Hollywood Park Racetrack
- Qualification: 3 years & older
- Purse: $30,375 (1954)

The Golden West Pace is a defunct three-race series in harness racing for Standardbred pacers aged three and older. It was first run in 1946 with a purse of $50,000 which at the time was the richest offered in the sport. The race final was hosted on an alternating basis, until the final running in 1954, by Santa Anita Park in Arcadia, California, and Hollywood Park Racetrack in Inglewood, California. During the same period, these tracks also offered the corresponding Golden West Trot.

== Historical race events ==
Canceled after the 1954 running, the Golden West Pace would prove to be the precursor to the American Pacing Classic run exclusively at Hollywood Park from 1955 through 1981.

== Records ==
Most wins by a driver

- 2 – Edward G. Cobb (1949, 1950) & Benny Schue (1952, 1953)

Most wins by a trainer

- 2 – Edward G. Cobb (1949, 1950) & Benny Schue (1952, 1953)

Stakes record

- 2:30 3/5 – Dudley Hanover (1952) at 1 1/4 miles
- 2:22 1/5 – Dudley Hanover (1953) at 1 3/16 miles

== Winners of the Golden West Pace ==
Year	Winner	Age	Driver	Trainer	Owner	Distance	Time	Purse	Track
1954	Red Sails	6	Gene L. Sears	Bob Walker	Herbert T. King	1 3/16 m.	2:22 3/5	$30,375	Hol
1953	Dudley Hanover	6	Benny Schue	Benny Schue	Hayes Fair Acres Stable (Eugene J. Hayes)	1 3/16 m.	2:22 1/5	$34,000	Hol
1952	Dudley Hanover	5	Benny Schue	Benny Schue	Hayes Fair Acres Stable (Eugene J. Hayes)	1 1/4 m.	2:30 3/5	$31,000	Sa
1951	Irish Hal	4	Jimmy Fitzpatrick	Harry C. Fitzpatrick	Kenneth D. Owen	1 1/4 m.	2:34 0/0	$33,750	Hol
1950	Jerry The First	6	Edward G. Cobb	Edward G. Cobb	Edward G. Cobb, et al.	1 1/4 m.	2:32 1/5	$50,000	Sa
1949	Jerry The First	5	Edward G. Cobb	Edward G. Cobb	Edward G. Cobb, et al.	1 1/4 m.	2:31 0/0	$50,000	Hol
1948	Indian Land	7	Joe O'Brien	Joe O'Brien	Castleton Farms	1 1/4 m.	2:33 0/0	$50,000	Sa
1947	April Star	6	Ray Reeves	Ralph L. Craig	Craig Stable (Ralph L. Craig)	1 1/4 m.	2:32 0/0	$50,000	Hol
1946	Blue Again	6	Jimmy Cruise, Sr.	William D. Fraser	R. Warren Leatherdale	1 1/4 m.	2:32 1/5	$50,000	Sa
