= William Post (polo player) =

American polo player (1911–1965)

Personal information
- Full name: William Post II
- Nickname: Billy Post
- Born: 1911 East Williston, New York, U.S.
- Died: August 24, 1965 (aged 53–54) Aiken, South Carolina, U.S.
- Education: Princeton University
- Occupations: Polo player horse trainer

Sport
- Position: Back
- Club: Meadowbrook Polo Club

William Post, also known as Billy Post, was an American polo player and horse trainer who competed at the international level during the 1930s. He was inducted into the Polo Hall of Fame in 2016.

== Early life and education ==
William "Billy" Post II was born in East Williston, New York, United States. He was the son of Fred H. and Elizabeth Lott Post of Aiken and Old Brookville. He came from a New York polo family that made its living primarily through the breeding of polo ponies. His grandfather, William Post, was a prominent horse dealer who founded William Post & Son and became one of the largest dealers in polo ponies in the United States.

He received his early education from The Hill Preparatory School. He later attended Princeton University, where he played the sport of polo. He was a member of the Princeton Tigers 1930 intercollegiate championship polo team alongside Leonard Firestone and John Lemp. He was also a member of the University Cottage Club and graduated from Princeton in June 1932.

== Career ==
Post played polo with the Whippany River Club of Morristown, New Jersey. He rode with Dr. J. D. Richards and went to the final match of the 1930 national junior polo championship, only to be beaten by the U.S. Army polo team for the title. The next year, he had shifted from Whippany River to Roslyn which was captained by Harold E. Talbott. By 1931, he had established himself as a high-level polo player and was known for his strong backfield play. In late July 1931, he competed in the annual junior national polo championship tournament at the Rumson Country Club in Rumson, New Jersey. He played on the Roslyn polo quartet which included Harold Talbott, Ray Firestone, and Seymour H. Knox. He played against his former team, Whippany River, winning the tournament's semifinal on July 22, 1931. Following the match, the handicap committee of the U.S. Polo Association held its summer meeting and raised his handicap from five to six goals. His team advanced to the final, which was played on Herbert Memorial Field at the club. After winning the national title with his junior team, Post represented Talbott's Roslyn team in international matches held in August 1931.

He joined the Rovers polo team during the local polo season at the Nautilus Field in Miami Beach in December 1931. During the 1932 season, Post played for the newly formed Sands Point Club polo team. That year, he was selected to represent the United States in Argentina in competition for the Argentine Open Polo Championship. His early departure prevented him from participating in the final matches of the season for Sands Point Club at the Meadow Brook Club. In September 1932, he travelled with the American polo team which competed in the Argentine Open and a series of international matches in South America. His team included S. H. Knox, James P. Mills, Elmer Boeseke, J. C. Rathborne, and Stephen Sanford. He played at back for the American team in Argentina. On November 19, 1932, he played in his first match of the Cup of the Americas polo series in Buenos Aires, where Meadowbrook defeated the Santa Paula team from Argentina before a crowd of 19,000. His team won the President of Argentina's cup in December 1932. Following 17-day voyages to and from South America, the team returned with victories in the Argentine Open Championship and the Chilean Championship. Post was commended by Knox for his riding and accuracy as a shooter.

Two years out of Princeton, he was regarded as one of the promising young backs in the United States. He served as a spare player on the East team for the east–west matches played in Chicago in July 1933. In August 1933, the seven-goal player received an invitation to play back for the Hurlingham Polo Club of Buenos Aires at the Argentine national championship that November.

He was part of the Aurora polo team selected by the U.S. Polo Association in March 1934 to play in the leading tournaments in England. The three other members of the Aurora four included Captain S. H. Knox, H. E. Talbott Jr., and E. J. Boeseke. Post sailed aboard the Bremen for England in April 1934, where he competed in the British polo tournaments, including the Roehampton Open, the Ranelagh, and Champion Cup. He played his first matches in May at the Beaufort Polo Club. On June 6, 1934, Post and his teammates defeated the Roehampton four in an overtime match. The young backfield player helped his team capture the Hurlingham Open polo cup tournament on June 30, 1934. After the Aurora had won two of the three big English tournaments at Roehampton and Hurlingham, he played in the King's Coronation Cup match against the English Knaves at Ranelagh on July 9, 1934.

In September 1934, Post represented the East in an East vs. West series at Meadowbrook Polo Club in Westbury, New York. He played at back alongside Michael Phipps, J. P. Mills, and Winston Guest.

His American handicap was raised to eight goals by 1936, placing him among the highest-rated polo players in the country. Post declined an invitation from the U.S. States Polo Association to play for the U.S. international team in England in 1936 because of business commitments. He continued competing at the highest level into the late 1930s. He remained rated at eight goals in the American handicap listings in 1937. His polo career was later cut short by the onset of World War II.

=== Harness racing career ===
In July 1936, Post shifted his sporting interests from polo to harness racing and purchased the trotter Hollyrood Marshall. He and his polo teammate Dunbar Bostwick joined E. Roland Harriman, R. J. Reynolds, and John P. Scripps as prominent members of the American harness racing community. He brought the horse out for its debut at the Grand Circuit meeting at the Historic Track in Goshen from July 21 to 25. He was elected a member of the Trotting Horse Club of America in November 1936.

He began training race horses full time in 1942.

== Personal life ==
Post married Elizabeth Fowler Andrew on September 19, 1933, in West Point, Indiana. He and Elizabeth had two sons, William and Frederick.

== Death ==
William Post II died on August 24, 1965, in Aiken, South Carolina, United States, at age 54.

== Legacy ==
He was inducted into the Polo Hall of Fame in Lake Worth, Florida, in 2016.
