= Bingen (horse) =

American Standardbred sire

- Breed: Standardbred
- Sire: Electioneer
- Grandsire: Hambletonian 10
- Dam: May King
- Damsire: Young Jim
- Sex: Stallion
- Foaled: 1893
- Died: 1913
- Breeder: David Bennet
- Owner: George W. Leavitt; E. H. Greeley; J. Malcolm Forbes; David M. Look

Bingen (1893–1913) was an American Standardbred horse. A descendant of Hambletonian 10, he is considered one of the most important sires in the development of the modern Standardbred breed.

== Career ==
Bingen created a bloodline in the making of the American Standardbred through the Hambletonian 10 offspring Electioneer. Bingen was bred by David Bennet of Lexington. He was broken in by Raymond Snedeker in 1894. George W. Leavitt of Boston and E. H. Greeley of Ellsworth, Maine, bought him the same year. In 1895, his career as a sire started in Maine. Henry Titer at the Mystic Park Track developed him for racing. The same year he got a new owner in J. Malcolm Forbes. He was exhibited at the Boston Horse Show in 1897, and won all his classes and was Best in Show all categories. He exclusively operated as a sire in 1899 at Forbes Farm in Massachusetts. In 1904, he was sold in the sale ring, but stayed in Massachusetts. He was sold again and served at different studs in New York between 1909 and 1911. The aging horse got his final owner in David M. Look of Castleton Farm in Lexington, Kentucky and was placed in service at the stud from 1912 until his death 1913. His offspring numbered 565.

== Pedigree ==
Tail-male pedigree: May King - Electioneer - Hambletonian.
Tail-female pedigree: Young Miss by Young Jim - Miss Mambrino by Red Wilkes - Miss Clark by Alric - Kate by Clark Chief - Lida by Vandal^{xx}.

== Offspring ==
The blood of Bingen was kept alive in Russia through sons exported there. Among them was Gay Bingen and sires of his descendants were imported to Sweden from what at the time was the Soviet Union (SU). One was Torg, whose offspring numbered 192. Torg's pedigree: by Guron (SU) out of Gyshpanka (SU), by Gildejets (SU), by Gay Bingen (US), by Bingen (US).

Bingen's sire line descent tree
- Bingen
  - Todd
    - Bob Douglas
      - Gazavat
        - Gedzj
          - Guron
            - Torg
  - Uhlan
  - J Malcolm Forbes

== Gallery ==
Bingen 29567 structure chart notation pedigree
