= Proximity (horse) =

American Standardbred racehorse

Proximity (1942–1966) was a Standardbred U.S. Harness Racing Hall of Fame inductee and Champion trotting racemare. She was trained and driven by future Canadian and U.S. Hall of Fame inductee Clint Hodgins. Owned by Ralph & Gordon Verhurst, in 1950 the then eight-year-old mare was voted the American Harness Horse of the Year. At the time of her 1975 induction into the Hall of Fame, the selection committee called her "one of the greatest free-for-allers in trotting history." Proximity retired with career earnings of $252,929 which made her the leading money-winning Standardbred in history, regardless of sex or gait.

Proximity regularly won against male competitors including in major events such as the 1950 Golden West Trot and the 1947 and 1950 American Trotting Championship.

Proximity died in 1966 at age 24 at Castleton Farm in Lexington, Kentucky.
