= Rigby Yard =

Railyard in South Portland, Maine

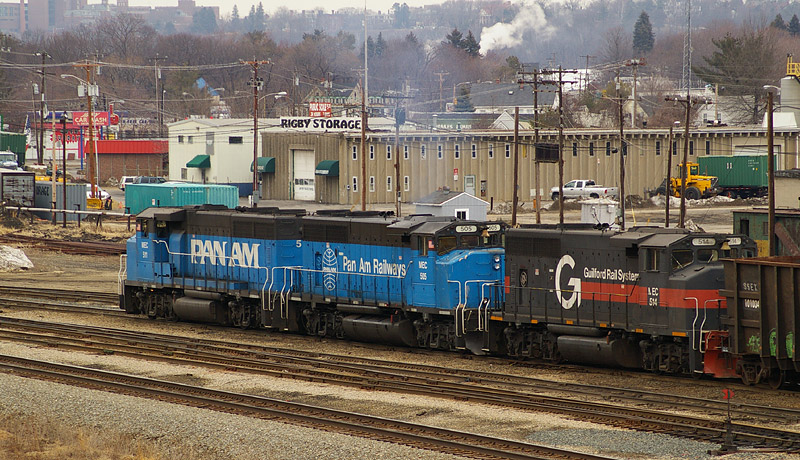
- A Pan Am Railways train at Rigby Yard in 2009

General information
- Location: South Portland, Maine; U.S.
- Coordinates: 43.6230°N 70.2968°W
- Operator: Pan Am Railways

Construction
- Structure type: at-grade

History
- Opened: 1923 (103 years ago)
Location

Rigby Yard is a classification yard in South Portland, Maine, United States, operated by Pan Am Railways, a subsidiary of CSX Transportation. It was originally constructed between 1922 and 1923 on the site of the former Rigby Park by the Portland Terminal Company, a subsidiary of the Maine Central Railroad. As built, it had capacity for over 2,000 railroad cars at a time. The yard handled up to 75,000 railroad cars per year during the 1980s, with operations by both the Boston and Maine Railroad and the Maine Central.

After its 2022 acquisition of Pan Am, CSX undertook construction on the yard to reduce the number of derailments. This included the replacement of 50 turnouts and over 20,000 ties.

The yard covers around 245 acres (99 ha).
