= Octave Blake =

American businessman and harness racing executive (1895–1969)

- Born: 1895
- Died: January 8, 1969 (aged 73–74)
- Occupations: Businessman; harness racing executive; horse owner; horse breeder
- Known for: President of the Grand Circuit

Octave Blake (1895–January 8, 1969) was an American businessman, race horse owner and breeder, and harness racing executive. He owned Newport Stock Farm in Pinehurst, North Carolina, and served as president of the Grand Circuit for more than two decades. Blake was the owner of Newport Dream, winner of the Hambletonian in 1954, and was inducted into the U.S. Harness Racing Hall of Fame in 1968.

== Early life and education ==
Octave Blake was born in 1895. He was the son of I. O. Blake, president of the Crystal Springs Company of New York.

He attended Princeton University where he played varsity football. He also became involved in aviation while he was in college. While he was a sophomore at Princeton, he received one of the first pilot licenses issued by the Fédération Aéronautique Internationale in March 1916. His next few years involved quarterbacking the Princeton Tigers football team and teaching young Navy men to fly aircraft. He became a graduate of Princeton in 1918.

During World War I, Blake served as a flight lieutenant and commanded Squadron 12 of the United States Navy air service in 1917 and 1918. His interest in aviation continued after the war, leading him to take a mechanic's position with the Curtiss Aeroplane and Motor Company in Buffalo. He was assigned to grind engine valves and earned 35 cents an hour. He first worked on the Curtiss JN Jenny, a training plane for airmen in World War I.

== Business career ==
Blake established Cornell Electrical Company in 1924. The company initially produced high-quality radio receivers before expanding into the manufacture of "B" battery eliminators. The financial difficulties the company later encountered were eased by an investment his father had made for him years earlier. I. O. Blake had given his son a colt that initially showed little promise as a racehorse and was eventually used for plowing. After further training, the horse became a winner, and its sale proceeds were invested in Canadian bonds for Blake. When Cornell Electric later struggled to obtain credit and faced difficulty meeting its payroll, Blake sold the bonds and used the proceeds to help the company through the crisis. It later developed the capacitor Blake had envisioned while serving in the Navy. The new capacitor helped establish Cornell as a leader in its industry, and the company was reorganized as the Cornell-Dubilier Manufacturing Co., Inc. in 1933. He expanded the company into one of the largest manufacturers of capacitors in the United States. In 1954, Blake, then serving as president, opened a new plant in Sanford, North Carolina. The Cornell-Dubilier Electrical Corporation had grown into a multi-million dollar electronics equipment firm.

Blake was named to the Radio Replacement Parts Committee of the War Production Board in July 1942.`

He retired from his position as chief executive of Cornell-Dubilier in 1965.

== Harness racing career ==
=== Newport Stock Farm ===
Blake became prominent in harness racing as the owner and breeder of Standardbred horses. After his father died in 1943, he assumed control of the Newport Stock Farm stable and relocated to South Plainfield, New Jersey. The horses were shipped to Pinehurst, North Carolina, each fall, where they underwent winter training for their stake engagements under head trainer Fenner Hawkins. He owned and operated Newport Stock Farm, where he bred and raced horses for the Grand Circuit. Among the first notable horses bred at Blake's farm was Forbes Chief, who won the Little Brown Jug in 1947.

=== Grand Circuit ===
Blake was unanimously elected president of Grand Circuit Inc. at its 74th annual meeting in December 1946, succeeding Charles W. Phellis of Greenwich, Connecticut. The Newport Stock Farm owner assumed his duties as president in preparation for the 1947 racing season. He served as president of the Grand Circuit from 1947 to 1967.

He served on the Board of Trustees of the Trotting Horse Museum, which received a charter from the New York State Board of Regents in 1949. The organization later became the Harness Racing Museum & Hall of Fame in Goshen, New York.

He was also one of the major stockholders in Vernon Downs and served as the track's first president for a three-year term.

=== 1954 Hambletonian Stakes ===
In 1954, Blake's Newport Dream won the Hambletonian Stakes at Good Time Park in Goshen, New York. The victory was Blake's first as a Hambletonian-winning owner. His beach home on Cape Cod was destroyed by a hurricane in 1955, causing the Hambletonian trophy to be lost. Several days later, the trophy and its base were found in the sand after washing ashore.

=== Safety helmet ===
Blake played a key role in promoting the use of safety helmets among harness racing drivers.

== Death ==
Octave Blake died on January 8, 1969, in New York, United States. He was serving as chairman of the board of the Grand Circuit at the time.

== Legacy ==
Blake received the 1954 Proximity Achievement Award from the United States Harness Writers Association for his contributions to harness racing.

In 1967, Blake was elected to the United States Harness Racing Hall of Fame and was formally inducted in 1968.
