= Hanover Shoe =

American shoe company

Coordinates: 39°48′11.46″N 76°59′13.32″W

- Hanover Shoe Building (April 2004)
- Industry: Manufacturing
- Genre: Fashion
- Founded: December 26, 1899; Hanover, Pennsylvania, U.S.
- Founder: Harper Donelson Sheppard, C.N. Myers
- Area served: United States
- Products: Shoes
- Parent: Clarks

Hanover Shoe in Hanover, Pennsylvania, was once one of the largest and most successful shoe companies in York County, Pennsylvania.

== History ==
Harper Donelson Sheppard was born in Pitt County, North Carolina, on October 9, 1868, the 13th of 15 children. Sheppard then entered into a financial partnership with C.N. Myers, and together they established the Hanover Shoe on December 26, 1899, with a common vision: sell the best shoes possible for one price, $2.50 a pair, and eliminate the middle-man by selling directly to the public. They opened their first store in York in June 1900; within fifteen years the Hanover Shoe Company had 61 stores from Indianapolis to New York City.

The two men were also responsible for financing or operating such ventures as the Hanover General Hospital, the Evening Sun, the public waterworks and two impounding dams, the local athletic field and the Hanover Shoe Farms, today the largest standardbred nursery in the world.

In 1966, the Hanover Shoe Company opened a manufacturing facility in Franklin, West Virginia & Marlinton, West Virginia, and contracted shoe orders for Bostonian and JC Penney and made shoes for their own Hanover brand. In 1978, C&J Clark purchased the Hanover Shoe Company and moved their North American headquarters to Hanover, Pennsylvania. The company moved all operations to West Virginia in 1996 because of cheaper taxes. The original Hanover Shoe building on Carlisle Street in Hanover, Pennsylvania, was converted to residential apartments in 2001, after sitting abandoned since the 1970s. The power plant is now a museum for the Hanover Fire Department.

A Hanover Shoe retailer remains in Hanover, Pennsylvania, but its shoes are manufactured outside of the United States.

Horween Leather Company in Chicago supplies leather shells for footwear to Hanover Shoe.

== See also ==
- Hanover Shoe Farms
- Hanover, Pennsylvania
