= Blair Burgess =

Canadian harness racing trainer (born 1961)

Blair Burgess (born 27 September 1961) is a Canadian harness racing trainer.

Burgess was born in Toronto to Robert Burgess, a Canadian Hall of Fame harness racer. His horses have earned more than $27 million in winnings. Burgess has won some of the world's most significant harness and pacing races, including the Hambeltonian (2x), the Little Brown Jug and the trotting Triple Crown.

In 2006, his trainee Glidemaster was named 2006 Harness Horse of The Year.

In 2017, Burgess was elected into the Canadian Horse Racing Hall of Fame. The next year, he was inducted into the Harness Racing Museum's Living Hall of Fame.
