= 1955 World Ninepin Bowling Classic Championships =

European bowling competition

2nd World Ninepin Bowling Classic Championships
- Host city: Essen
- Country: West Germany
- Nations: 8
- Athletes: 80
- Events: 4
- Opening: August 30, 1955
- Closing: September 5, 1955

The 1955 World Ninepin Bowling Classic Championships was the second edition of the championships and was held in Essen, West Germany, from 30 August to 5 September 1955.

In the men's competition the title was won by East Germany in the team competition and by Eberhard Luther (East Germany) in the individual event. In the women's competition the title was won by East Germany in the team competition and by Francka Erjavec (Yugoslavia) in the individual event. Czechoslovakia entered its first championship and earned a bronze medal in the men's team event.

== Participating teams ==
=== Men ===
- Austria
- Czechoslovakia
- East Germany
- France
- (Saar Protectorate) Saar
- Switzerland
- West Germany
- Yugoslavia

=== Women ===
- Austria
- East Germany
- West Germany
- Yugoslavia

== Results ==
=== Men - team ===
The competition was played with 200 throws mixed (100 full, 100 clean). Teams were composed of 6 competitors
and the scores were added up.

| Rank | Team | Result |
|---|---|---|
| 1st place, gold medalist(s) | East Germany; Gerhard Grohs; Rudolf Franke; Bernd Rumpf; Herbert Uhlmann; Eberhard Luther; Hans Grettner | 4987; 832; 826; 833; 827; 846; 823 |
| 2nd place, silver medalist(s) | Yugoslavia; Stanko Hladnik; Evgen Kobal; Stanko Pogelšek; Avgust Likovnik; Vlado Martelanc; Dujam Smoljanović | 4941; 797; 815; 812; 833; 844; 840 |
| 3rd place, bronze medalist(s) | Czechoslovakia; Jaroslav Hlavnička; Jaroslav Kovář; Imrich Mihál; František Prejsler; Štefan Fazika; Jaroslav Řezáč | 4801; 811; 769; 818; 840; 793; 770 |
| 4 | West Germany; Guretzka; Prell; Priemer; Wigger; Rohrmann; Josef Bröhl | 4795; 828; 774; 770; 785; 786; 852 |
| 5 | Austria; Wilfling; Kastelic; Saurwein; Friedrich Beschl; Alfred Baierl; Johann Heidvogel | 4617; 737; 792; 782; 794; 730; 782 |
| 6 | France; Bomwänger; Hukendubler; Rene Weiss; Burck; Pierre Neff; Charles Metzger | 4360; 713; 665; 745; 735; 723; 779 |
| 7 | (Saar Protectorate) Saar; Hukendubler; Josef Assmann; Gehres; Thomé; Britz; Kubig | 4264; 718; 712; 749; 703; 642; 740 |
| 8 | Switzerland; Josef Schüler; Mergenthaler; Fritz Brönimann; Paul Brühlmann; Donalti; Fritz Bölsterli | 4020; 640; 655; 672; 687; 709; 657 |

=== Women - team ===
The competition was played with 100 throws mixed (50 full, 50 clean). Teams were composed of 6 competitors
and the scores were added up.

| Rank | Team | Result |
|---|---|---|
| 1st place, gold medalist(s) | East Germany; Hannelore Cebulla; Charlotte Zeibig; Franziska Heinold; Anni Küttner; Elisabeth Dornack; Irmgard Handschke | 2199; 355; 386; 347; 341; 360; 410 |
| 2nd place, silver medalist(s) | Yugoslavia; Ljerka Prezelj; Anika Jakovec; Ruža Vaštag; Jelena Šincek; Franciška Erjavec; Barbara Bulić | 2177; 373; 345; 308; 368; 408; 375 |
| 3rd place, bronze medalist(s) | West Germany; Luise Leute; Heise; Gerda Berndt; Eva Jeschawitz; Kalb; Elisabeth Förster | 2136; 371; 306; 378; 325; 368; 388 |
| 4 | Austria; Herein; Hedwig Biedermann; Rosa Kesselgruber; Hensel; Steffi Weiss; Maria Schmoranzer | 2131; 318; 378; 373; 406; 349; 307 |

=== Men - individual ===
| Rank | Name | Nation | Score |
|---|---|---|---|
| 1st place, gold medalist(s) | Eberhard Luther | East Germany | 886 |
| 2nd place, silver medalist(s) | Johann Heidvogel | Austria | 866 |
| 3rd place, bronze medalist(s) | Gerhard Grohs | East Germany | 865 |
| 4. | Hans Grettner | East Germany | 863 |
| 5. | Avgust Likovnik | Yugoslavia | 856 |
| 6. | Rudolf Franke | East Germany | 851 |
| 7. | Stanko Hladnik | Yugoslavia | 845 |
| 8. | Jaroslav Hlavnička | Czechoslovakia | 843 |
| 9. | Jaroslav Kovář | Czechoslovakia | 832 |
| 10. | Charles Metzger | France | 829 |
| 11. | Saurwein | Austria | 826 |
| 12. | Dujam Smoljanović | Yugoslavia | 824 |
| 13. | Vlado Martelanc | Yugoslavia | 823 |
| 14. | Bernd Rumpf | East Germany | 821 |
| 15. | Evgen Kobal | Yugoslavia | 813 |
| 16. | Wigger | West Germany | 809 |
| 17. | Josef Bröhl | West Germany | 806 |
| 18. | Štefan Fazika | Czechoslovakia | 803 |
| 19. | Stanko Pogelšek | Yugoslavia | 802 |
| 20. | Friedrich Beschl | Austria | 790 |
| 21. | Guretzka | West Germany | 782 |
| 22. | Jan Nechvátal | Czechoslovakia | 778 |
| 23. | Jaroslav Řezáč | Czechoslovakia | 775 |
| 24. | Hans Heindel | Austria | 772 |
| 25. | Rohrmann | West Germany | 769 |
| 26. | Ader | Austria | 767 |
| 27. | František Prejsler | Czechoslovakia | 763 |
| 28. | Priemer | West Germany | 760 |
| 29. | Werner Heinze | East Germany | 759 |
| 30. | Bürk | France | 756 |
| 31. | Raus | Austria | 748 |
| 32. | Gehres | (Saar Protectorate) Saar | 737 |
| 33. | Schneider | France | 731 |
| 33. | Kessler | France | 731 |
| 35. | Nierengarten | France | 724 |
| 36. | Josef Schüler | Switzerland | 723 |
| 37. | Josef Assmann | (Saar Protectorate) Saar | 710 |
| 37. | Fritz Brönnimann | France | 710 |
| 39. | Hukendubler | (Saar Protectorate) Saar | 708 |
| 40. | Wermuth | West Germany | 706 |
| 41. | Alfred Baierl | Austria | 704 |
| 42. | Fritz Bölsterli | Switzerland | 701 |
| 43. | Britz | (Saar Protectorate) Saar | 699 |
| 44. | Guy | France | 682 |
| 45. | Paul Brühlmann | Switzerland | 680 |
| 46. | Thomé | (Saar Protectorate) Saar | 659 |
| 47. | Mergenthaler | Switzerland | 610 |
| 47. | Donalti | Switzerland | 610 |

=== Women - individual ===
| Rank | Name | Nation | Score |
|---|---|---|---|
| 1st place, gold medalist(s) | Franciška Erjavec | Yugoslavia | 432 |
| 2nd place, silver medalist(s) | Anni Küttner | East Germany | 399 |
| 3rd place, bronze medalist(s) | Irmgard Handschke | East Germany | 387 |
| 4. | Ljerka Prezelj | Yugoslavia | 385 |
| 5. | Liduše Kusnierzová | Czechoslovakia | 381 |
| 6. | Jelena Šincek | Yugoslavia | 379 |
| 7. | Hannelore Cebulla | East Germany | 375 |
| 7. | Elisabeth Dornack | East Germany | 375 |
| 9. | Anežka Osvaldová | Czechoslovakia | 373 |
| 10. | Rosa Kesselgruber | Austria | 370 |
| 11. | Charlotte Zeibig | East Germany | 364 |
| 11. | Barbara Bulić | Yugoslavia | 364 |
| 13. | Jokordoe | Yugoslavia | 359 |
| 14. | Jechawitz | West Germany | 357 |
| 15. | Steffi Weiss | Austria | 350 |
| 16. | Hedwig Biedermann | Austria | 349 |
| 16. | Elisabeth Förster | West Germany | 349 |
| 18. | Maria Schmoranzer | Austria | 345 |
| 19. | Heise | West Germany | 340 |
| 20. | Winklerová | Czechoslovakia | 334 |
| 21. | Svajda | Austria | 332 |
| 22. | Ruža Vaštag | Yugoslavia | 330 |
| 23. | Gerda Berndt | West Germany | 327 |
| 24. | Gretel Lindner | East Germany | 326 |
| 25. | Luise Leute | West Germany | 318 |
| 25. | Marija Šimunić | Yugoslavia | 318 |
| 25. | Kalb | West Germany | 318 |
| 28. | Marie Langmayer | Austria | 309 |

== Medal summary ==
=== Medal table ===
* Host nation (Host nation)

| Rank | Nation | Gold | Silver | Bronze | Total |
|---|---|---|---|---|---|
| 1 | East Germany (GDR) | 3 | 1 | 2 | 6 |
| 2 | Yugoslavia (YUG) | 1 | 2 | 0 | 3 |
| 3 | Austria (AUT) | 0 | 1 | 0 | 1 |
| 4 | Czechoslovakia (TCH) | 0 | 0 | 1 | 1 |
| 4 | West Germany (FRG)* | 0 | 0 | 1 | 1 |
| Totals (5 entries) | | 4 | 4 | 4 | 12 |

=== Men ===
| Event | Gold | Silver | Bronze |
|---|---|---|---|
| Individual | Eberhard Luther; East Germany | Johann Heidvogel; Austria | Gerhard Grohs; East Germany |
| Team | East Germany; Gerhard Grohs; Rudolf Franke; Bernd Rumpf; Herbert Uhlmann; Eberhard Luther; Hans Grettner | Yugoslavia; Stanko Hladnik; Evgen Kobal; Stanko Pogelšek; Avgust Likovnik; Vlado Martelanc; Dujam Smoljanović | Czechoslovakia; Jaroslav Hlavnička; Jaroslav Kovář; Imrich Mihál; František Prejsler; Štefan Fazika; Jaroslav Řezáč |

=== Women ===
| Event | Gold | Silver | Bronze |
|---|---|---|---|
| Individual | Franciška Erjavec; Yugoslavia | Anni Küttner; East Germany | Irmgard Handschke; East Germany |
| Team | East Germany; Hannelore Cebulla; Charlotte Zeibig; Franziska Heinold; Anni Küttner; Elisabeth Dornack; Irmgard Handschke | Yugoslavia; Ljerka Prezelj; Anika Jakovec; Ruža Vaštag; Jelena Šincek; Franciška Erjavec; Barbara Bulić | West Germany; Luise Leute; Heise; Gerda Berndt; Eva Jeschawitz; Kalb; Elisabeth Förster |
