= Golden West Trot =

- Class: Discontinued
- Location: Arcadia & Inglewood, California
- Inaugurated: 1946
- Race type: Harness race for standardbred trotters

Race information
- Distance: 1 3/16 miles (1,911 metres or 9.5 furlongs)
- Surface: Dirt, 1/2-mile oval (Santa Anita Park) & 1-mile oval (Hollywood Park)
- Track: Santa Anita Park & Hollywood Park Racetrack
- Qualification: 3 years & older
- Purse: $50,000 (1954)

The Golden West Trot is a defunct three-race series in harness racing for Standardbred trotters aged three and older. It was first run in 1946 with a purse of $50,000 which at the time was the richest offered in the sport. The race final was hosted on an alternating basis, until the final running in 1954, by Santa Anita Park in Arcadia, California, and Hollywood Park Racetrack in Inglewood, California. During the same period, these tracks also offered the corresponding Golden West Pace.

== Historical race events ==
The only multiple winner of the race was 1951 American Harness Horse of the Year and a future U.S. Racing Hall of Fame inductee Pronto Don who won three straight editions of the Golden West Trot between 1951 and 1953.

== Records ==
Most wins by a driver

- 3 – Benny Schue (1951, 1952, 1953)

Most wins by a trainer

- 2 – Benny Schue (1952, 1953)

Stakes record

- 2:30 3/5 – Pronto Don (1951) at 1 1/4 miles
- 2:22 4/5 – Scotch Victor (1954) at 1 3/16 miles

== Winners of the Golden West Trot ==
Year	Winner	Age	Driver	Trainer	Owner	Distance	Time	Purse	Track
1954	Scotch Victor	5	Joe O'Brien	Joe O'Brien	S. A. Camp Farms	1 3/16 m.	2:22 4/5	$32,500	Hol
1953	Pronto Don	8	Benny Schue	Benny Schue	Hayes Fair Acres Stable (Eugene Hayes)	1 3/16 m.	2:25 3/5	$30,550	Hol
1952	Pronto Don	7	Benny Schue	Benny Schue	Hayes Fair Acres Stable (Eugene Hayes)	1 1/4 m.	2:34 4/5	$30,650	Sa
1951	Pronto Don	6	Benny Schue	Fay Fitzpatrick	Hayes Fair Acres Stable (Eugene Hayes)	1 1/4 m.	2:30 3/5	$32,000	Hol
1950	Proximity	8	Clint Hodgins	Clint Hodgins	Ralph & Gordon Verhurst	1 1/4 m.	2:31 2/5	$50,000	Sa
1949	Chris Spencer	7	Billy Haughton	Dunbar Bostwick	Dunbar Bostwick	1 1/4 m.	2:33 4/5	$50,000	Hol
1948	Rodney	4	Bion Shively	Bion Shively	R. Horace Johnston	1 1/4 m.	2:31 3/5	$50,000	Sa
1947	Algiers	5	Harry C. Fitzpatrick	Harry C. Fitzpatrick	Baker Acres Stable (Edward J. Baker)	1 1/4 m.	2:32 3/5	$50,000	Hol
1946	Kaola	6	Carl Hatchell	Carl Hatchell	S. and W. Stable	1 1/4 m.	2:32 0/0	$50,000	Sa
