= Kite Track =

Horse-racing track in Maine

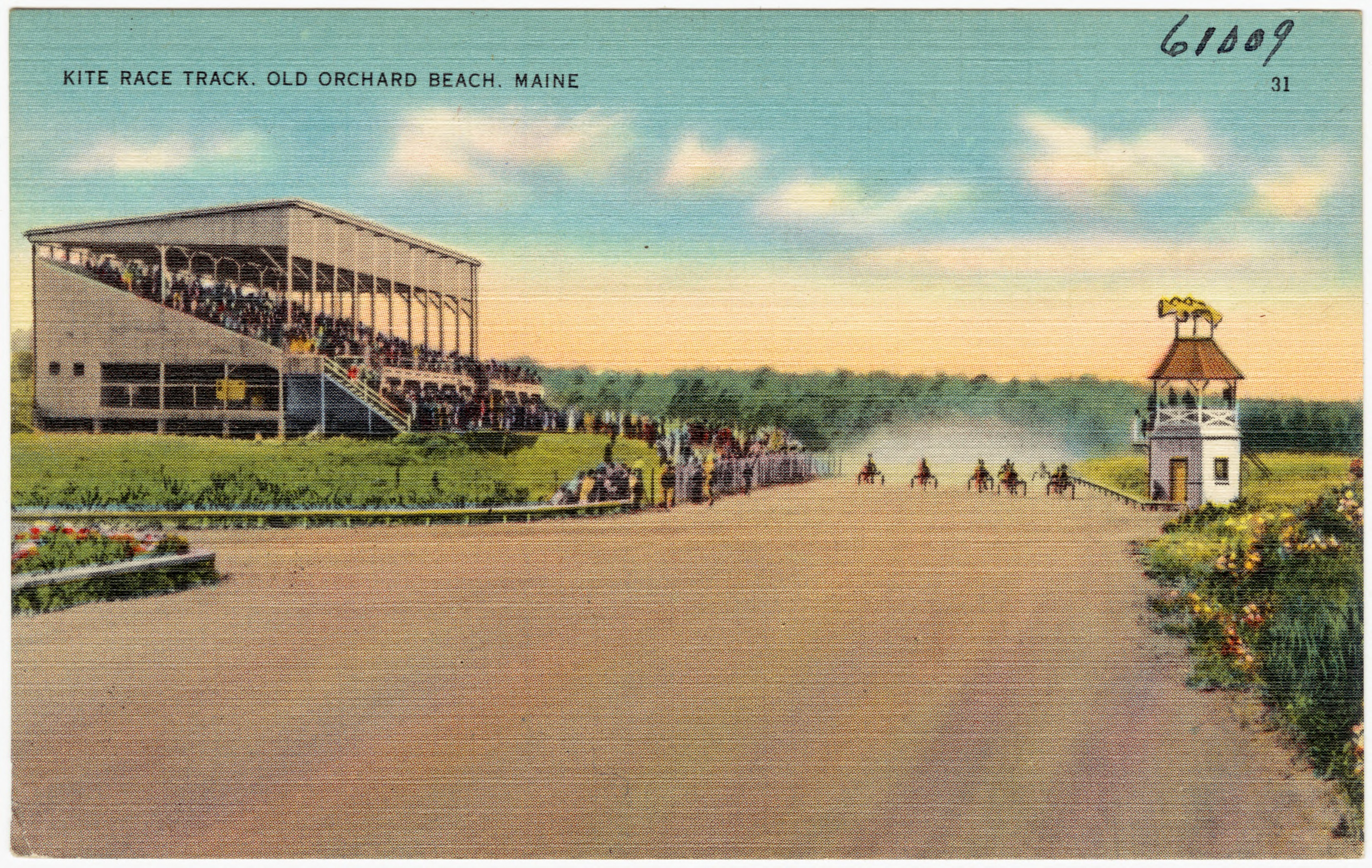
- Kite Track, Old Orchard Beach, Maine
- Interactive map of Kite Track
- Location: Old Orchard Beach, Maine
- Coordinates: 43°31′39″N 70°22′23″W
- Date opened: 1892 (original); 1936 (reopening)
- Date closed: 1902 (original); 1949 (reopening)
- Race type: Harness racing
- Course type: Kite track

The Kite Track was an American harness racing track in Old Orchard Beach, Maine.

== Beginnings ==
In the winter of 1891, New England trotting horse owners, who had desired for many years to race in Maine, began working on establishing a track in the state. After being unable to find a suitable location in Portland, Maine, the focus turned to Old Orchard Beach, which believed a horse track would contribute to its success as a resort town. On December 29, 1891, the directors of the Mile Track Association of Maine held a meeting to discuss the proposed track and the vast majority of members opposed it, believing that the season would be too short and being so close to the ocean would be dangerous to the horses' cooling-off process. As a result of the inability to agree on a location, one faction of horsemen, led by John F. Haines and M. F. Porter began work on the Old Orchard Beach Kite Track while the Mile Track Association worked on a track in Portland. In 1893, Rigby Park opened in South Portland, Maine.

The track had only one turn and its stretches converged at a point, forming a kite-like shape. It was one of a few tracks built in this shape, which was faster than a traditional oval.

The track's opening day was scheduled for July 4, 1892, however it was postponed due to rain. On July 7, the track's first day of racing saw 3,000 patrons turn out to the unfinished grandstand to watch three races. In 1900, the New England Agricultural Society moved its annual cattle show and fair to the Kite Track, which resulted in the construction of a new exhibition hall, ticket office, barns, business office, stage, and bandstand. In 1903, after several years of poor weather and small entry lists, the track closed.

== Revival ==
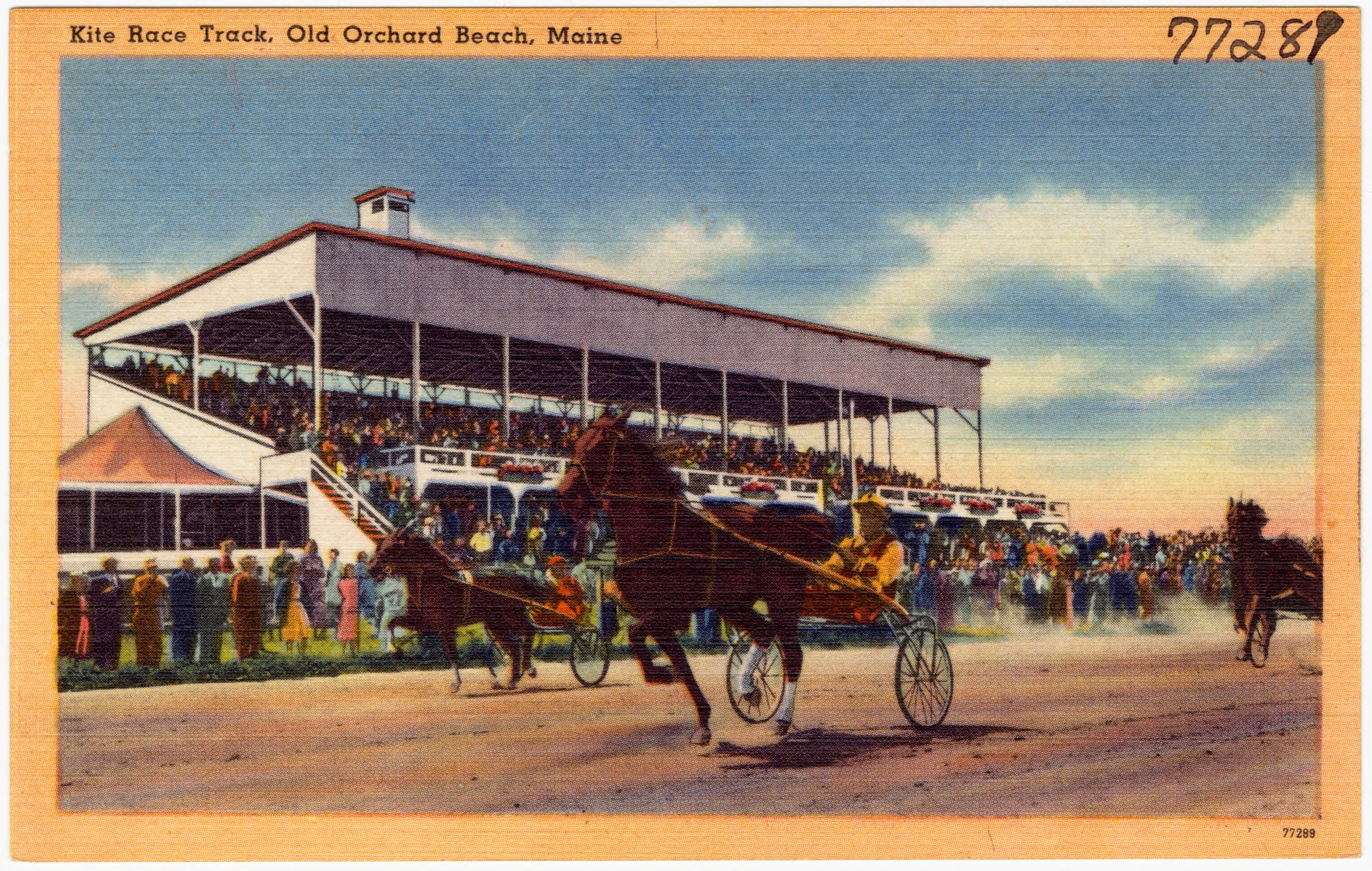
Kite Track, Old Orchard Beach, Maine

In 1935, Maine legalized parimutuel betting. The following summer, racing returned to the Kite Track when the Grand Circuit chose Old Orchard Beach to host its pre-Hambletonian races. The track closed with the opening of nearby Scarborough Downs in 1950. The grandstand was eventually torn down and the lights relocated to Scarborough Downs. In 1973 the property was purchased by the State of Maine, it is now a game management area.
