= Trotting Triple Crown =

American harness horse racing honor

In the United States, the Trotting Triple Crown is a series of three major harness races for three-year-old Standardbred trotters. It consists of the Hambletonian, the Yonkers Trot, and the Kentucky Futurity. It was inaugurated in 1955 with the creation of the Yonkers Trot (then called the Yonkers Futurity). A horse that wins all three races is designated as a Triple Crown winner and receives the Trotting Triple Crown trophy.

The Kentucky Futurity, held at The Red Mile in Lexington, Kentucky, is the longest-running of the three events, having been inaugurated in 1893. The Hambletonian's inception came in 1926; the race will be held at Hoosier Park in Anderson, Indiana starting in 2027 after previously being held at the Meadowlands Racetrack in East Rutherford, New Jersey. The Yonkers Trot has been held at Yonkers Raceway in Yonkers, New York since its inception in 1955.

The first horse to win the Trotting Triple Crown was Scott Frost, who won it in its inaugural year. Nine horses have won the Trotting Triple Crown: Scott Frost (1955), Speedy Scot (1963), Ayres (1964), Nevele Pride (1968), Lindy's Pride (1969), Super Bowl (1972), Windsong's Legacy (2004), Glidemaster (2006), and Marion Marauder (2016). Glidemaster and Marion Marauder are the only living Trotting Triple Crown winners.

Stanley Dancer is the only trainer to win the Trotting Triple Crown more than once as a trainer or a driver. Dancer trained and drove both Nevele Pride and Super Bowl to Triple Crown wins.

== Winners ==
Trotting Triple Crown winners
Horse	Year	Driver	Trainer	Owner
Scott Frost	1955	Joe O'Brien	Joe O'Brien	S. A. Camp Farms (Sol Camp)
Speedy Scot	1963	Ralph N. Baldwin	Ralph N. Baldwin	Castleton Farm
Ayres	1964	John F. Simpson Sr.	John F. Simpson Sr.	Charlotte Sheppard
Nevele Pride	1968	Stanley Dancer	Stanley Dancer	Nevele Acres, Louis Resnick
Lindy's Pride	1969	Howard Beissinger	Howard Beissinger	Lindy Farm, Inc.
Super Bowl	1972	Stanley Dancer	Stanley Dancer	Rachel L. Dancer, Rose Hild Breeding Farm
Windsong's Legacy	2004	Trond Smedshammer	Trond Smedshammer	Ann Brannvoll, Ted Gewertz, Patricia Spinelli
Glidemaster	2006	George Brennan, John Campbell	Blair Burgess	Robert Burgess, Karin-Olsson Burgess, Marsha Cohen, Brittany Farms
Marion Marauder	2016	Scott Zeron	Paula Wellwood	Jean Wellwood, Devin Keeling
