= Scott Frost (horse) =

American Standardbred racehorse

- Breed: Standardbred
- Sire: Hoot Mon
- Grandsire: Scotland
- Dam: Nora
- Damsire: Spencer
- Sex: Stallion
- Foaled: 1952
- Died: 1983
- Country: United States
- Color: Bay
- Breeder: Tanglewood Farm (Estate of W. N. Reynolds)
- Owner: S. A. Camp Farms, Inc.
- Racing colors: Gold & White
- Trainer: Joe O'Brien
- Record: 71: 51-10-4
- Earnings: $310,685
- Gait: Trot
- Driver: Joe O'Brien
- Mile record: 1:58.3
- Groom: Don Beal

Major wins
- American Trotting Classic (1955, 1956); U.S. Trotting Derby (1956) U.S. Trotting Triple Crown wins: Hambletonian Stakes (1955); Yonkers Trot (1955); Kentucky Futurity (1955)

Awards
- United States Two-Year-Old Trotter of the Year (1954); Harness Horse of the Year (1955, 1956)

Honors
- United States Harness Racing Hall of Fame (1984)
- Last updated on November 29, 2016

Scott Frost (1952–1983) was a United States Harness Racing Hall of Fame Standardbred trotter trained and driven by future Hall of Fame inductee Joe O'Brien. His performances on the racetrack in 1954 saw him voted United States Two-Year-Old Trotter of the Year and in 1955 he became the first winner of the U.S. Trotting Triple Crown series and was voted U.S. Harness Horse of the Year. Racing at age four in 1956, Scott Frost became the first horse to twice win Harness Horse of the Year honors.

== Breeding and sale ==
Scott Frost was bred by Tanglewood Farm in Clemmons, North Carolina owned by William N. Reynolds. On his death in 1951, the Executors of his estate sold the broodmare Nora in utero to Roy Amos, owner of Frost Hill Farm in Edinburgh, Indiana. Scott Frost was foaled and raised there until being sold at a 1953 Tattersalls Yearling Sale for $8,200 to Saull Camp, owner of S. A. Camp Farms, Inc. of Shafter, California.
