= The Red Mile =

Horse racing track in Kentucky, US

Coordinates: 38°02′39″N 84°31′06″W

- Interactive map of The Red Mile
- Location: Lexington, Kentucky
- Owned by: Lexington Trots Breeders Association
- Date opened: September 28th, 1875
- Race type: harness racing American Flat Track

The Red Mile is a horse racing track located in Lexington, Kentucky, United States. The track hosts harness racing, a type of horse racing in which the horses must pull two-wheeled carts called sulkies while racing. It is one of harness racing's most famous tracks and is located in the heart of the Bluegrass region, an area of Kentucky famous for horse breeding and racing.

In 2014, The Red Mile announced it was partnering with Keeneland to build a $30 million historical racing facility, with 1,000 terminals, scheduled to open September 2015. In May 2015, Keeneland also announced that it would move most of its Off-track betting operations to The Red Mile beginning July 15, 2015, investing over $2 million upgrading The Red Mile's grandstand area.

== Facilities ==
The race track itself is one mile long and made of red clay, which gives the track its name.

In addition to the race track, The Red Mile features a two-story clubhouse, a round barn, and a park. The clubhouse is often used for weddings, parties, and other gatherings. The Tattersalls area can accommodate large groups and is often used for horse sales.

== History ==
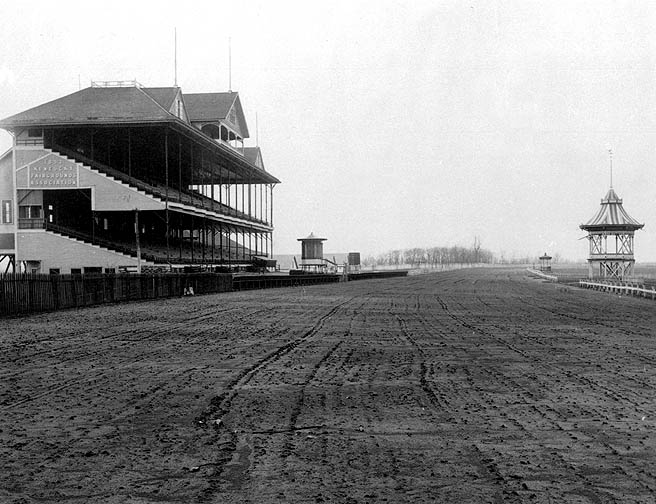
KY Trotting Assoc, 1898

The track was founded on September 28, 1875, and was sponsored by the Kentucky Trotting Horse Breeders Association. Attendance to the opening races was minimal because the track had not been advertised. Once newspapers published articles about the new track, attendance picked up. The track is the second-oldest harness racing track in the world and the oldest horse racing track in Lexington.

The Red Mile hosts one of the legs of the Triple Crown of Harness Racing for Trotters, the annual Kentucky Futurity.

Since 2017, American Flat Track motorcycle racing is conducted during the off-season.

In 2023, the Railbird Music Festival was held in the infield. The bill included 32 acts over two days, headlined by Zach Bryan and Kentucky native Tyler Childers. An estimated 40,000 people attended the festival each day.

The Red Mile will host the annual Breeders Crown in 2027. It previously hosted divisions of the Breeders Crown races in 1984 and 1987.
