= Hanover Shoe Farms =

Coordinates: 39.76940°N 77.02316°W

Hanover Shoe Farms, Inc. is a North American Standardbred horse breeding facilities. Its history traces back to the early 1900s.

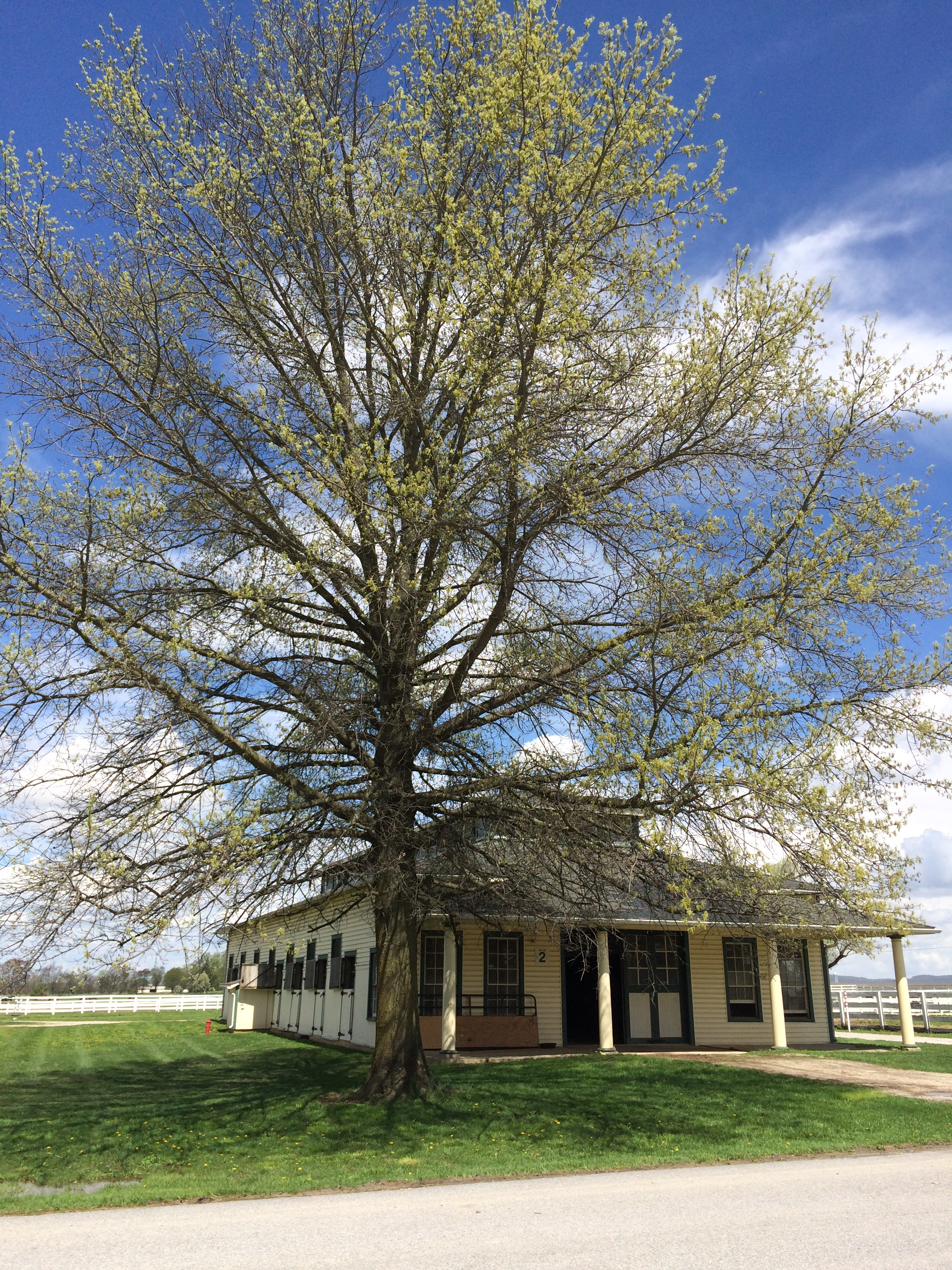

In the book Quest For Excellence, Dean Hoffmann, an executive editor of Hoof Beats magazine, chronicled the farm's history as it approached its 75th anniversary in 2001. Hoffmann stated in his opening chapter: "Any businessman, coach, or athlete will tell you that while it's certainly a great accomplishment to rise to the top in your chosen field, it's an even greater accomplishment to remain on top. By that definition, Hanover Shoe Farms leaves you searching for a word more powerful than " dynasty "

In 2001, Hanover Shoe Farms set the all-time breeder earnings record regardless of breed with $21,372,418 in annual progeny earnings.

The farm encompasses 2,426 acres (10 km^{2}) in and around Hanover, Pennsylvania, in the United States. It is home to 9 stallions, 336 yearlings and over 500 broodmares. The yearling farm is located near Gettysburg, Pennsylvania and a satellite stallion station is located in Lambertville, New Jersey with two more stallions. Hanover Shoe Farm has produced world champion racehorses and its stallions have sired a multitude of winners.

== History ==
Founded in the early 1900s as Hanover Shoe Stables by Harper D. Sheppard and Clinton N. Myers, owners of the Hanover Shoe Company, a manufacturer and retailer of leather shoes, the racing stable was started as a venture for the two businessmen. Hanover Shoe Stables fell under the management of Lawrence B. Sheppard, Sheppard's son, in 1922 and in 1926, he purchased a 69 horse dispersal from the estate of A.B. Coxe for $150,000. According to The Kentucky Harness Horse, written by Standardbred historian Ken McCarr, it was "the start of one of the largest and most prominent harness horse nurseries in the world".

In 1926, the farm began to sell small consignments of yearlings at public auction. In 1928, Hanover's Bertha (t,3,T1:59,1/2m, $71,779), a daughter of Peter Volo out of Miss Bertha Dillion who was purchased from the Coxe estate, was retained by the farm and trained by Tom Berry. She set a two-year-old trotting record of 2:02 in 1929, and it wasn't until 1934 that her record was equaled by Lawrence Hanover, her full brother. As a three-year-old, Hanover's Bertha was undefeated and gave the stable its first Hambletonian victory. She trotted the first 2:00 mile in an official race while winning the 1930 Kentucky Futurity.

Lawrence Sheppard was president of the United States Trotting Association from 1950–1958 and was its honorary life president. He was the first chairman of the Pennsylvania Racing Commission, an amateur driver and founded the Hall of Fame of the Trotter located in Goshen, New York. As stated by Philip A. Pines, author of The Complete Book of Harness Racing, Sheppard "played major roles throughout the sport's modern history".

In 1964, John Simpson took over the management of the farm as Sheppard's health began to decline. Upon Sheppard's death, his widow, Charlotte Sheppard, became Hanover's chairman of the board and the farm continued under the leadership of Simpson & Paul Spears. Simpson continued to acquire the top-quality stallions and broodmares.

In 1972 they won the Trotting Triple Crown Champion and Trotter of the Year with Super Bowl (t,2,1:56.2m, $601,350) and the 1971-1972 Horse of the Year and World Champion pacer with Albatross (p,4,1:54.3f, $1,201,470). Their early crops were a success on the racetrack and launched their sires to the top of every breed category. At the Harrisburg sale in 1977, Super Bowl's offspring averaged $32,673 and Albatross' averaged $41,767.

In 1977, Warm Breeze, the record holder of history's fastest race mile (p,1:53.1), and trotter Songflori (who had time trialed in t,1:55.1) were added to Hanover's stallion ranks.

== Present day ==
Under the reins of Paul Spears, Jim Simpson (John F. Simpson's son) & Russell Williams (Lawrence Sheppard's grandson), Hanover Shoe Farms still raises stallions. In 2001, Hanover's veteran pacing stallions, No Nukes and Big Towner, ranked first and second on the all-time earnings list among active pacing sires, with career progeny earnings over $109 million and $105 million respectively.

Additions to Hanover's mare include the 2005 Kentucky Filly Futurity and World Trotting Derby winner, Her Culese (t,3,1:53.3m, $354,658), the 2004 Buckette and Review Stake winner, Bramasole (t,4,1:53.1, $347,753), the 1998 Jugette, Matron, NJSS 3Year Old Filly Championship winner, Armbro Romance (p,3,1:49.4m, $794,375), and 2001 Harness Horse of the Year, Bunny Lake (p,1:49m, $2,843,476).

== See also ==
- Standardbred horse
- Harness Racing
- Harness Racing Museum & Hall of Fame
