= Kentucky Futurity =

- Class: Triple Crown
- Location: Lexington, Kentucky; United States
- Inaugurated: 1893
- Race type: Harness race for standardbred trotters
- Website: www.redmileracing.com

Race information
- Distance: 1 mile (1,609 meters or 8 furlongs)
- Surface: Dirt, 1 mile oval
- Track: The Red Mile
- Qualification: 3yo
- Purse: $500,000 (2014)

The Kentucky Futurity is a stakes race for three-year-old trotters, held annually at The Red Mile in Lexington, Kentucky since 1893.

It is part of the Triple Crown of Harness Racing for Trotters.

In the 2007 race, Donato Hanover's winning time of 1:51.1 set the world record for a 1-mile trotting horse.

In winning the 2016 running of the Kentucky Futurity, Marion Marauder became the ninth horse from 124 runnings to win the Triple Crown of Harness Racing for Trotters.

2025 г. | Emoticon Legacy | L.Roy | 1.49,2 | Победитель приза Кентукки Футурити .

== Winners of the Kentucky Futurity ==
Year	Winner	Driver	Trainer	Owner	Time	Purse
2024	Sig Sauer	Andy McCarthy	Noel Daley	Patricia Stbl, Sbrocco, JAF Racing, Allister Stbl, Caviart Farm	1:49 3/5	$675,676
2023	Tactical Approach	Scott Zeron	Nancy Takter	Robert Leblanc, John Fielding, Joe Sbrocco and JAF Racing	1:52 0/5	$450,000
2022	Rebuff	Tim Tetrick	Lucas Wallin	Kjell Magne Andersen, Lucas Wallin and Pieter Delis	1:50 3/5	$430,000
2021	Jujubee	Andy McCarthy	Greg Wright Jr.	Jon Erdner	1:49 3/5	$560,000
2020	Amigo Volo	Dexter Dunn	Richard Norman	Pinske Stables and David J. Miller	1:51 0/5	$444,000
2019	Greenshoe	Brian Sears	Marcus Melander	Courant Inc, Hans Backe, Lars Granqvist & Morten Langl	1:51 1/5	$450,000
2018	Six Pack	Ake Svanstedt	Ake Svanstedt	Ake Svanstedt, Little E, Stall Kalmar & Lars Berg	1:49 1/5	$620,000
2017	Snowstorm Hanover	Matt Makaley	Ron Burke	Burke Racing Stable, Baldachino, Collura & Bruscemi	1:53 2/5	$420,000
2016	Marion Marauder	Scott Zeron	Paula Wellwood	Devin Keeling and Marion Wellwood	1:52 3/5	$431,000
2015	Pinkman	Yannick Gingras	Jimmy Takter	Takter, Fielding, McClelland, Liverman	1:51 2/5	$527,000

== Earlier winners ==
- 2014 - Nuncio
- 2013 - Creatine
- 2012 - My MVP
- 2011 - Manofmanymissions
- 2010 - Wishing Stone
- 2009 - Muscle Hill
- 2008 - Deweycheatumnhowe
- 2007 - Donato Hanover
- 2006 - Glidemaster
- 2005 - Strong Yankee
- 2004 - Windsong's Legacy
- 2003 - Mr. Muscleman
- 2002 - Like a Prayer
- 2001 - Chasing Tail
- 2000 - Credit Winner
- 1999 - Self Possessed
- 1998 - Trade Balance
- 1997 - Take Chances
- 1996 - Running Sea
- 1995 - CR Track Master
- 1994 - Bullville Victory
- 1993 - Pine Chip
- 1992 - Armbro Keepsake
- 1991 - Whiteland Janice
- 1990 - Star Mystic
- 1989 - Peace Corps
- 1988 - Huggie Hanover
- 1987 - Napoletano
- 1986 - Sugarcane Hanover
- 1985 - Flak Bait
- 1984 - Fancy Crown
- 1983 - Power Seat
- 1982 - Jazz Cosmos
- 1981 - Filet of Sole
- 1980 - Final Score
- 1979 - Classical Way
- 1978 - Doublemint
- 1977 - Texas
- 1976 - Quick Pay
- 1975 - Noble Rogue
- 1974 - Waymaker
- 1973 - Arnie Almahurst
- 1972 - Super Bowl
- 1971 - Savoir
- 1970 - Timothy T
- 1969 - Lindy's Pride
- 1968 - Nevele Pride
- 1967 - Speed Model
- 1966 - Governor Armbro
- 1965 - Armbro Flight
- 1964 - Ayres
- 1963 - Speedy Scot
- 1962 - Safe Mission
- 1961 - Duke Rodney
- 1960 - Elaine Rodney
- 1959 - Diller Hanover
- 1958 - Emily's Pride
- 1957 - Cassin Hanover
- 1956 - Nimble Colby
- 1955 - Scott Frost
- 1954 - Harlan
- 1953 - Kimberly Kid
- 1952 - Sharp Note
- 1951 - Ford Hanover
- 1950 - Star's Pride
- 1949 - Bangaway
- 1948 - Egan Hanover
- 1947 - Hoot Mon
- 1946 - Victory Song
- 1941 - Bill Gallon
- 1940 - Spencer Scott
- 1939 - Peter Astra
- 1938 - McLin Hanover
- 1937 - Twilight Song
- 1936 - Rosalind
- 1935 - Lawrence Hanover
- 1934 - Princess Peg
- 1933 - Meda
- 1932 - The Marchioness
- 1931 - The Protector
- 1930 - Hanover's Bertha
- 1929 - Walter Dear
- 1928 - Spencer
- 1927 - Iosola's Worthy
- 1926 - Guy McKinney
- 1925 - Aileen Guy
- 1924 - Mr McElwyn
- 1923 - Ethelinda
- 1922 - Lee Worthy
- 1921 - Rose Scott
- 1920 - Arion Guy
- 1919 - Periscope
- 1918 - Nella Dillon
- 1917 - The Real Lady
- 1916 - Volga
- 1915 - Mary Putney
- 1914 - Peter Volo
- 1913 - Etowah
- 1912 - Manrico B
- 1911 - Peter Thompson
- 1910 - Grace
- 1909 - Baroness Virginia
- 1908 - The Harvester
- 1907 - General Watts
- 1906 - Siliko
- 1905 - Miss Adbell
- 1904 - Grace Bond
- 1903 - Sadie Mac
- 1902 - Nella Jay (Jay Hawker)
- 1901 - Peter Sterling
- 1900 - Fereno
- 1899 - Boralma
- 1898 - Peter the Great
- 1897 - Thorn
- 1896 - Rose Croix (Jay Bird)
- 1895 - Oakland Baron
- 1894 - Beuzetta
- 1893 - Oro Wilkes
