= Niatross =

American Standardbred racehorse

- Breed: Standardbred
- Sire: Albatross (US)
- Grandsire: Meadow Skipper (US)
- Dam: Niagara Dream (US)
- Damsire: Bye Bye Byrd (US)
- Sex: Stallion
- Foaled: March 30, 1977
- Died: June 7, 1999
- Country: United States
- Color: Bay
- Breeder: Mrs. Elsie Berger (US)
- Owner: Mrs. Elsie Berger (US); Clint Galbraith (US)
- Trainer: Clint Galbraith (US)
- Record: 39:37-0-0
- Earnings: US$2,019,213

Major wins
- Bluegrass Stakes (1979); Woodrow Wilson Pace (1979); American Pacing Classic (1980); Prix d'Été (1980); Meadowlands Pace (1980); James Dancer Memorial (1980); Battle Of The Brandywine (1980); Oliver Wendell Holmes Pace (1980) U.S. Pacing Triple Crown wins: Little Brown Jug (1980); Cane Pace (1980); Messenger Stakes (1980)

Awards
- 2 Year Old Colt Pacer of the Year, Pacer of the Year & Harness Horse of the Year (1979); 3 Year Old Colt Pacer of the Year, Pacer of the Year & Harness Horse of the Year (1980); Triple Crown of Harness Racing for Pacers

Honors
- First standardbred to win break the 1:52, 1:51 and 1:50 barriers; First standardbred to win $2 million; United States Harness Racing Hall Of Fame; Canadian Horse Racing Hall of Fame
- Last updated on 2016-01-23

Niatross (1977–1999) was an American champion standardbred race horse that many believe was the greatest harness horse of all time.

== Background ==
The son of Albatross out of the mare Niagara Dream, Niatross was foaled on March 30, 1977. He was trained and driven by co-owner Clint Galbraith.

== Racing career ==
In September 1979, after Niatross won his first six races, a half interest in him was sold to Stockbroker Lou Guida and the Niatross syndicate for $2.5 million. He was unbeaten in 13 starts in his 2-year-old season, when he was named Harness Horse of the Year. His earnings of $604,900 were a two-year-old record for either the Standardbred or Thoroughbred breed.

In 1980, Niatross won The Meadowlands Pace, which was the first million dollar race in either standardbred or thoroughbred racing history. He also won the Triple Crown. In a time trial at The Red Mile in Lexington, Kentucky he beat the world record by three seconds, setting a mark of 1:49.1. In addition to his time trial he paced the fastest race miles on one mile (1.52.1) and half mile (1.54.4) tracks. The 1980 season brought Niatross 24 wins from 26 starts.

Early in the 1980 season Niatross won the Cane Pace before racing at the Saratoga Standardbred track in Saratoga, NY, where he spooked and fell over the inside hubrail and was defeated for the first time. In an elimination for the Meadowlands Pace, he broke stride, lost valuable ground, regained his gait and, in what Stanley Dancer described as the greatest performance he had seen, recovered and finished 4th, qualifying for the final. In the Meadowlands Pace final, Niatross went right to the front and never looked back, winning by 4 1/2 lengths from Storm Damage in 1.53.1 as the 2-5 favourite. He set a world record for his age and was only 1/5 of a second outside of the overall world record. Trainer Clint Galbraith described the race as being more important than any race in Niatross' career. Niatross went on to beat all of his competition easily in future starts, frequently setting track records, including a new race, track and Canadian record during the prestigious Prix d'Été at Blue Bonnets racetrack in Montreal, Quebec. He also won the Gaines Memorial at Vernon Downs, the Oliver Wendell Holmes Pace at the Meadowlands, the Dancer Memorial at Freehold and the American Classic at Hollywood Park. In the Little Brown Jug Niatross recorded wins in straight heats of 1.55 and 1.54.4 setting six world records before a record Jug crowd of 45,621. He then won the Messenger Stakes to complete the Triple Crown. A December appearance at Pompano Park, his last career race, brought a crowd of more than 23,000.

== Time Trial ==
Until 1980 the fastest mile recorded in harness racing was 1.52.0 by Steady Star. On October 1, 1980 Niatross time trialled at The Red Mile in Lexington, Kentucky with a previous best of 1.52.4 recorded at Syracuse earlier in the year. At The Red Mile Niatross reached the quarter mile in 27.3 almost one second faster than Steady Star's record and the half mile in 54.3 equal with Steady Star. Reaching the three quarter mile in 1.21.4, a 27.2 last quarter resulted in a mile of 1.49.1, the fastest ever by 2 4/5 seconds.

== Stud career ==
By the time Niatross retired to stud at Castleton Farm, Kentucky, in 1981, he had earned more prize money than any other standardbred horse in history. He had been named Harness Horse of the Year in 1979 and 1980, the New York Post Athlete of the Year in 1980, and Harness Horse of the Decade for the 1980s. At stud, he commanded a top price for his services. Among his progeny were winners of the Little Brown Jug. One son, Nihilator, won Horse of the Year honors and his first two crops earned $8.6 million. Niatross was relocated to Pine Hollow Farm in New York in 1983 and to Saratoga Standardbred Farm in 1986 however he was not as successful in New York as he had been in Kentucky.

In 1996, when he was 19 years old, Niatross made a 20-city tour for his fans in Canada and the United States. In 1997, he was inducted as a member of the Living Horse Hall of Fame. In May 1999, he took ill and was transported to the University of Pennsylvania's New Bolton Center where he was diagnosed with a large cancerous mass in his abdomen. On June 7, 1999, Niatross was humanely euthanized. He was cremated with his remains interred at the Hall Of Fame Museum in Goshen, New York.

== Pedigree ==
Pedigree of Niatross (USA), bay stallion, 1977
Sire Albatross (USA) 1968	Meadow Skipper (USA); 1961	Dale Frost	Hal Dale
Sire Albatross (USA) 1968	Meadow Skipper (USA); 1961	Dale Frost	Galloway
Sire Albatross (USA) 1968	Meadow Skipper (USA); 1961	Countess Vivian	Kings Counsel
Sire Albatross (USA) 1968	Meadow Skipper (USA); 1961	Countess Vivian	Filly Direct
Sire Albatross (USA) 1968	Voodoo Hanover (USA); 1961	Dancer Hanover	Adios
Sire Albatross (USA) 1968	Voodoo Hanover (USA); 1961	Dancer Hanover	The Old Maid
Sire Albatross (USA) 1968	Voodoo Hanover (USA); 1961	Vibrant Hanover	Tar Heel
Sire Albatross (USA) 1968	Voodoo Hanover (USA); 1961	Vibrant Hanover	Vivian Hanover
Dam Niagara Dream (USA) 1964	Bye Bye Byrd (USA); 1955	Poplar Byrd	Volomite
Dam Niagara Dream (USA) 1964	Bye Bye Byrd (USA); 1955	Poplar Byrd	Ann Vonian
Dam Niagara Dream (USA) 1964	Bye Bye Byrd (USA); 1955	Evalina Hanover	Billy Direct
Dam Niagara Dream (USA) 1964	Bye Bye Byrd (USA); 1955	Evalina Hanover	Adieu
Dam Niagara Dream (USA) 1964	Scoot (USA); 1946	Scamp	Guy Abbey
Dam Niagara Dream (USA) 1964	Scoot (USA); 1946	Scamp	Sweet Miss
Dam Niagara Dream (USA) 1964	Scoot (USA); 1946	Doris Hanover	Spencer
Dam Niagara Dream (USA) 1964	Scoot (USA); 1946	Doris Hanover	Last Chance

== See also ==
- List of racehorses

== See also ==
- Niatross wins the Little Brown Jug - YouTube
