= Beach Towel (horse) =

American Standardbred racehorse

- Breed: Standardbred
- Sire: French Chef
- Grandsire: Meadow Skipper
- Dam: Sunburn
- Damsire: Armbro Nesbit
- Sex: Stallion
- Foaled: 1987
- Country: United States
- Colour: Bay
- Owner: Uptown Stables (Seth Rosenfeld)
- Trainer: Ray Remmen
- Record: 23:18-?-?
- Earnings: $2,091,860

Major wins
- Little Brown Jug (1990); Breeders Crown (1990); Meadowlands Pace (1990); Prix d'Été (1990)

Awards
- Harness Horse of the Year (1990)

Beach Towel (April 26, 1987 – March 21, 2009) was a Standardbred pacer who was named the 1990 American Harness Horse of the Year. He won 18 of his 23 starts with a fastest race mile of 1:50 and earnings of $2,091,860.

== Background ==
As a yearling, Beach Towel was bought for $22,000 by Seth Rosenfeld, the 24-year-old managing partner of the New York City-based Uptown Stables. The colt was trained and driven by Ray Remmen.

== Racing career ==
In 1989, Beach Towel won eleven of his thirteen races including the Presidential Stake, Matron Stake, and Potomac Stake and earned more than $478,000.

In July 1990, he contested the Meadowlands Pace at Meadowlands Racetrack and overcame an unfavorable draw to win by a nose from Jake And Elwood. On September 9, he lost to Jake And Elwood (who had won the Cane Pace) in the Messenger Stakes at Rosecroft Raceway.

Beach Towel started favorite for Little Brown Jug on September 20. Driven as usual by Remmen, he led from the start and won by one and a half lengths from In The Pocket in a time of 1:53.3.

In November, the colt contested the three-year-old pacer division of the Breeders Crown at the five-eighths of a mile track at Pompano Beach. He won by three lengths from In The Pocket in a time of 1:51.2, becoming the first harness racer to win more than $2 million in a single year.

He also won the Delvin Miller Adios and many other races.

== Stud record ==
Beach Towel was also a successful sire. Amongst his offspring was Jenna's Beach Boy who once held the record for the fastest race mile of all time in harness racing history. Another of his offspring was Somebeachsomewhere, the 2008 Harness Horse of the Year.

In 2007, Beach Towel went into retirement at the Woodlands Stud in New Zealand. He died on March 21, 2009, following a severe attack of colic.

He was inducted into the Harness Racing Hall of Fame in 2005.

== Pedigree ==
Pedigree of Beach Towel (USA), bay stallion, 1987
Sire French Chef (USA) 1978	Meadow Skipper (USA); 1960	Dale Frost	Hal Dale
Sire French Chef (USA) 1978	Meadow Skipper (USA); 1960	Dale Frost	Galloway
Sire French Chef (USA) 1978	Meadow Skipper (USA); 1960	Countess Vivian	King's Counsel
Sire French Chef (USA) 1978	Meadow Skipper (USA); 1960	Countess Vivian	Filly Direct
Sire French Chef (USA) 1978	La Pomme Souffle (USA); 1972	Nevele Pride	Stars Pride
Sire French Chef (USA) 1978	La Pomme Souffle (USA); 1972	Nevele Pride	Thankful
Sire French Chef (USA) 1978	La Pomme Souffle (USA); 1972	Pompanette	Florican
Sire French Chef (USA) 1978	La Pomme Souffle (USA); 1972	Pompanette	Spinster Hanover
Dam Sunburn (USA) 1977	Armbro Nesbit (Canada); 1970	Bye Bye Byrd	Poplar Byrd
Dam Sunburn (USA) 1977	Armbro Nesbit (Canada); 1970	Bye Bye Byrd	Evalina Hanover
Dam Sunburn (USA) 1977	Armbro Nesbit (Canada); 1970	Armbro Impel	Capetown
Dam Sunburn (USA) 1977	Armbro Nesbit (Canada); 1970	Armbro Impel	Dotties Pick
Dam Sunburn (USA) 1977	Sunbelle Hanover (USA); 1966	Tar Heel	Billy Direct
Dam Sunburn (USA) 1977	Sunbelle Hanover (USA); 1966	Tar Heel	Leta Long
Dam Sunburn (USA) 1977	Sunbelle Hanover (USA); 1966	Suave Hanover	Adios
Dam Sunburn (USA) 1977	Sunbelle Hanover (USA); 1966	Suave Hanover	Shy Ann
