= Fast Clip =

Standardbred racehorse

- Fast Clip at Sportsmans Park July 1972
- Sire: Good Time
- Dam: Hoot Suite
- Sex: Stallion
- Foaled: 1969
- Died: unknown
- Colour: Bay
- Owner: Bru-Bil Farm and Messenger Stables
- Trainer: Bruce Nickells

Major wins
- American National (1971); Geer Stakes (1972); Matron Stakes (1973); Single G Pace (1973)

Fast Clip (foaled 1969) was a Standardbred champion harness racing horse. He is considered one of the outstanding horses trained and driven by 2016 Harness Racing Hall of Fame inductee, Bruce Nickells.

Fast Clip made his stakes race debut at the 1971 American National for two-year-old pacers at Sportsman's Park. He won the race by a nose over Dancer George in a time of 2:04.3.

In August 1972, Fast Clip won the Geer Stakes in Du Quoin, Illinois with a time of 1:56.3. At the time that was one of dozen fastest winning miles in harness racing history.

Fast Clip was entered to race in the 1972 Little Brown Jug in Delaware, Ohio, the second leg of Harness racing's Triple Crown. In the 1972 Jug's second heat, Fast Clip finished second, one and one quarter lengths behind the winner Strike Out who broke the then record for a three-year-old pacer on a half mile track with a mark of 1:56.3. Later in 1972, Fast Clip finished second to Silent Majority in the L.K. Shapiro Stakes held at Hollywood Park in California.

As a four-year-old, Fast Clip finished fourth behind winner Keystone Pebble in the Realization Pace at Roosevelt Raceway. One month later, he won the Matron Stakes at Wolverine Raceway in a time of 1:58.3 while pre-race favorite Keystone Pebble finished fourth.

Fast Clip, who won purse money totaling $231,581, was retired from racing in 1974.
