= Keystone Ore =

American Standardbred racehorse

Keystone Ore was an American standardbred horse, who was the son of Bye Bye Bird. He was trained and driven by Stanley Dancer, and was honored as United States Harness Horse of the Year in 1976.

In 1976, Keystone Ore won the $200,000 Cane Pace held on August 21 at Yonkers Raceway, in front of a crowd of 24,458 fans, with his time of 1:57.2 in the mile distance setting the record for a 3-year-old pacer at that distance. Raven Hanover, driven by George Sholty, finished ¾ of a length behind the lead, with Windshield Wiper 1¼ lengths behind second.

Keystone Ore won the Little Brown Jug, the second leg of the Triple Crown of Harness Racing for Pacers, with a time of 1:57.4 against Armbro Ranger, who had won the first division of the race at the half-mile track at the Delaware County Fairgrounds in front of a crowd of 39,709, the second-largest attendance at the event. Keystone Ore had won the second division in a time of 1:57 for the mile, and the combined time of 3:54.4 broke a record for age, sex and gait on a half-mile track that had been set by Bret Hanover in 1965.

Heavily favored to win the Messenger Stakes and sweep the Triple Crown, Keystone Ore fell to Windshield Wiper, who finished three-quarters of a length ahead of Keystone Ore. Both Keystone Ore and Windshield Wiper had started in the second tier of the 11-horse race and were hemmed in on the rail. On the backstretch for the second time, both horses found room to the outside around the stretch turn, with Windshield Wiper pulling away in the last 50 yards. Keystone Ore had beaten Windshield Wiper in 13 of their races, but had lost when the two competed against each other at Freehold Raceway in a race held two weeks before the Messenger Stakes. Keystone Ore finished the season with earnings of $469,302, and a win in the Messenger would not only have earned the Triple Crown but would have put the horse just short of the single-season harness horse earnings record of $558,009 set by Albatross in 1971.
