= Pace of the Century =

The Pace of the Century was a match race between two of the greatest ever standardbred harness horses: Bret Hanover and Cardigan Bay. It was set up by Yonkers Raceway to draw in the fans.

Harness racing legend Stanley Dancer recalled for two appearances with Cardigan Bay, and his import from New Zealand later became the sport's first horse to top $1 million in career earnings.

On August 26, 1966, the largest crowd in the history of Batavia Downs — 15,118 — turned out for what was billed as The Pace of the Century. The race was won by Cardigan Bay.

In the so-called "Revenge Pace" also set up by Yonkers, driver Frank Ervin's Bret Hanover beat Dancer and Cardigan Bay in a track record 1:58 3/5. Cardigan Bay was one of only two horses to have ever beaten Bret Hanover but it wasn't close that evening as Bret Hanover won the $25,000 race by three lengths en route to being named Horse of the Year for the third straight time.

Dancer and the then 12-year-old Cardigan Bay returned to Batavia Downs in the summer of 1968. The Downs put up a $25,000 purse, and fans were expecting to watch history made with a victory by Cardigan Bay to top the $1 million mark. But Hervé Filion drove Good Time Boy to an upset victory as Cardigan Bay faded to fourth. The pacer topped the $1 million barrier one month later at Freehold in New Jersey and was retired.
