= Del Cameron =

American harness racing driver

Personal information
- Born: June 9, 1920 Harvard, Massachusetts
- Died: May 25, 1979 (aged 58) Wilmington, Delaware
- Occupations: Harness racing driver & trainer

Horse racing career
- Sport: Horse racing
- Career wins: 1358

Major racing wins
- Harriman Challenge Cup (1953); Hoosier Trot (1955, 1967); Prix d'Été (1976) U.S. Pacing Triple Crown wins: Little Brown Jug (1947, 1951) U.S. Trotting Triple Crown wins: Hambletonian Stakes (1954, 1965, 1967) International races: Elitloppet (heat) (1975)

Racing awards
- Harness Racing Hall of Fame (1974)

Significant horses
- Forbes Chief; Tar Heel; Newport Dream; Egyptian Candor; Speedy Streak

Adelbert "Del" Cameron (1920–1979) was an American harness racing driver. Cameron was voted into the Harness Racing Hall of Fame in 1974.

Cameron was born in Harvard, Massachusetts. Cameron along with his wife and two sons moved to Pinehurst, North Carolina in 1944 where he would spend winters training horses for over 30 years.

Cameron drove three horses, Newport Dream in 1954, Egyptian Candor in 1965, and Speedy Streak in 1967 to victories in the Hambletonian Stakes, one of the three legs of the Triple Crown of Harness Racing for Trotters. Newport Dream was lame with a mystery ailment in its left foreleg at the time of his Hambletonian win. In addition to his Hambletonian wins, Cameron drove Forbes Chief in 1947 and Tar Heel in 1951 to victories in the Little Brown Jug, one of the three legs of the Triple Crown of Harness Racing for Pacers. Del Cameron won 1,358 races and more than $4.7 million in purses over his career.

Harness racing driver/trainer and 2016 Hall of Fame inductee Bruce Nickells, worked two years for Cameron as a second trainer. Another Hall of Famer, Stanley Dancer, was given his first Hambletonian drive by Cameron in 1953. Cameron once said it took longer to train an owner than it did a horse.

Cameron died of a heart attack in Wilmington, Delaware on May 25, 1979.
