= Dave Palone =

Personal information
- Born: February 26, 1962 (age 64) Waynesburg, Pennsylvania
- Occupations: Harness racing driver & trainer

Horse racing career
- Sport: Horse racing

Major racing wins
- Adios Pace (1999); Little Brown Jugette (1999, 2003); Glen Garnsey Memorial Pace (2011, 2012) Breeders Crown wins: Breeders Crown 3YO Colt & Gelding Trot (2008); Breeders Crown 2YO Colt & Gelding Pace (2011); Breeders Crown 2YO Colt & Gelding Trot (2011) U.S. Pacing Triple Crown wins: Messenger Stakes (1996) Little Brown Jug (2005)

Racing awards
- U.S. Harness Racing Driving Champion (1999, 2000, 2004); Harness Tracks of America Driver of the Year (1999, 2000, 2003, 2004, 2009, 2013)

Honours
- United States Harness Racing Hall of Fame (2010)

Significant horses
- P Forty Seven, Sweet Lou
- Updated on November 29, 2016

David M. Palone (born February 26, 1962, in Waynesburg, Pennsylvania) is an American harness racing trainer and driver.

Palone became interested in harness racing after his father took him to watch the Adios Pace in 1976. A year later he went to work for trainer Herman Hylkema. Palone won his first race in 1983.

Palone has collected the most wins in a year three times (1999, 2000, and 2004) and was voted Harness Tracks of America Driver of the Year in 1999, 2000, 2003, 2004, and 2009.

On September 22, 2005, Palone drove P Forty Seven to victory in the Little Brown Jug. The Little Brown Jug is the second leg of the Triple Crown of Harness Racing for Pacers.

Palone was inducted into the Harness Racing Hall of Fame on July 4, 2010.

Palone drove his 15,000th career winner on March 26, 2012, at The Meadows racetrack. Before Palone, only Hervé Filion had reached that harness racing milestone.

On July 5, 2012, Palone set a new North American record for wins when he drove Herculotte Hanover to the winner's circle for his 15,181st career victory.

In January 2014, Palone was named Harness Tracks of America Driver of the Year for 2013.

On Friday, November 14, 2014, Palone set the world record for wins when he drove Missy Tap Tina to the winner's circle for his 16,754th career victory.

On June 25, 2022, Palone reached another milestone, becoming the first harness racer to reach 20,000 career wins after his victory in the fourth race at Hollywood Casino at the Meadows.
