= Laverne Hanover =

American Standardbred racehorse

- Breed: Standardbred
- Sire: Tar Heel
- Grandsire: Billy Direct
- Dam: Lavish Hanover
- Damsire: Adios
- Sex: Stallion
- Foaled: 1966
- Country: United States
- Colour: Brown
- Breeder: Hanover Shoe Farms
- Owner: Thomas W. Murphy, Jr.
- Trainer: Billy Haughton
- Record: 98: 61

Major wins
- Roosevelt Pace (1968); McMahon Memorial Pace (1968); Tom Hal Pace (1968); Review Stakes (1968); Adios Pace (1969); American Pacing Classic (1970); Tattersalls Pace (1969); Prix d'Été (1970); James Clark Memorial Pace (1971); Dan Patch Free-For-All Pace (1971); Martin Tananbaum International Pace (1971) U.S. Pacing Triple Crown wins: Little Brown Jug (1969)

Awards
- 1968 USA 2YO C&G Pacer of the Year; 1969 USA 3YO C&G Pacer of the Year; 1969 USA Fastest Pacer of The Year (1:56 3/5); 1970 USA 4YO H&G Pacer of the Year
- Last updated on October 16, 2016

Laverne Hanover (foaled 1966 in Pennsylvania) was a brown Standardbred horse whose wins included the 1969 Little Brown Jug, the most important race for three-year-old pacers, and the 1970 American Pacing Classic at Hollywood Park Racetrack.

Laverne Hanover was retired to stud at the end of the 1971 race season having won 61 of his 98 career starts. He had limited success as a sire.
