= Waples =

Waples is a surname. Notable people with the surname include:

- Douglas Waples (1893—1978), American author
- Keith Waples (1923–2021), Canadian Harness race driver
- Ron Waples (born 1944), Canadian Harness race driver
- Wesley Jonathan Waples (born 1978), American actor
