= John Hayes (harness racer) =

Canadian harness racing driver, trainer and owner

Personal information
- Born: July 17, 1919 Oshawa, Ontario, Canada
- Died: December 8, 1998 (aged 79) Grimsby, Ontario, Canada
- Occupations: Harness racing : driver / trainer / owner

Horse racing career
- Sport: Horse racing

Major racing wins
- Roosevelt Futurity (1971); Adios Pace (1972); Prix d'Été (1972) U.S. Pacing Triple Crown wins: Little Brown Jug (1975)

Honours
- Little Brown Jug Wall of Fame (1990); Canadian Horse Racing Hall of Fame (1991); United States Harness Racing Hall of Fame (2005)

Significant horses
- Alley Fighter, Keystone Pat, Penn Hanover, Sharp 'n' Smart, Strike Out
- Updated on January 10, 2017

John G. Hayes Sr. (July 17, 1919 – December 8, 1998), was a harness racing driver, trainer, and owner who was inducted into the Canadian and American harness racing halls of fame.

Born in Oshawa, Ontario, Canada, Hayes was the son of a dairy farmer, and went on to become a prominent figure in harness racing and the first Canadian to be selected to the Little Brown Jug's Wall of Fame. His greatest accomplishment was in training horses in particular when he developed the great champion, Strike Out.

A longtime director of the Canadian Trotting Association, for ten years Hayes served as its president. Hayes was also vice-chairman of the Ontario Racing Commission.

It had been Hayes' lifelong dream to win the Little Brown Jug, and was famous for having told a newspaper reporter: "I'd rather win the Little Brown Jug than go to heaven." When he died in 1998, the Little Brown Jug itself, won by Strike Out in 1972, was placed at the head of his casket.

John Hayes was inducted into the Little Brown Jug Wall of Fame in 1990, the Canadian Horse Racing Hall of Fame in 1991, and the United States Harness Racing Hall of Fame in 2005.

== Beejay Stable ==
The Beejay Stable was a harness racing stable and breeding business owned by John Hayes as managing partner in a partnership formed in 1959 with Montreal's Shapiro brothers, Conrad, Leo, and Robert. Among the horses owned by the partnership were Sharp 'n' Smart, Penn Hanover, Keystone Pat, Alley Fighter, and their most successful, the hall-of-fame pacer, Strike Out. Twenty-five years after the partnership was first formed, they established the Quarter Century Club as a vehicle for investments in various racing stock such as a share in sire Albatross and businesses including Castleton Farm and the Tattersalls Sales Company in Lexington, Kentucky.
