= Bruce Nickells =

Personal information
- Born: July 5, 1928 (age 98) Illinois, U.S.
- Occupation: Harness racing horse trainer
- Spouse: Joanne Nickells (m. 1957; died 2007)
- Children: 2

Horse racing career
- Sport: Horse racing

Major racing wins
- Canadian Pacing Derby (1971); Glen Garnsey Memorial Pace (1975) Breeders Crown wins: Breeders Crown Open Mare Pace (1987); Breeders Crown 2YO Filly Pace (1988, 1990, 1991, 1992) †; Breeders Crown 3YO Filly Pace (1991) U.S. Trotting Triple Crown wins: Hambletonian Oaks (1989): † denotes record

Racing awards
- Glen Garnsey Trophy (1990)

Honours
- U. S. Harness Racing Hall of Fame (2016)

Significant horses
- Combat Time; Batman; Kentucky; Fast Clip; Follow my Star; Miss Easy; Park Avenue Kathy
- Updated on November 15, 2016

Bruce Nickells (born July 5, 1928) is an American harness racing driver and trainer. Nickells was inducted into the Harness Racing Hall of Fame on July 4, 2016.

== Biography ==
Nickells, who grew up in Princeton, Illinois, began working with harness racing horses as a groom when he was 13 years old. Eight years later, his first start as a harness racing driver, in 1949, when he was 21 years old, was driving a horse named Great Dune at Aurora Downs. Nickells worked two years as a second trainer for Del Cameron before opening his own stable in 1953.

Nickells became known as a specialist in training young fillies as Pacers and is considered one of the best trainers of fillies in harness racing history. In 1964, Nickells drove Combat Time to victory in the second division of the Little Brown Jug at the County Fairgrounds in Delaware, Ohio before finishing second in the third and final division to Jug winner Vicar Hanover.

At the 1972 Little Brown Jug, Nickells drove Fast Clip to a second-place finish, one and one fourth lengths behind the winner Strike Out. Strike Out, who had been trained by Nickells for two months the previous winter, won the Jug with a time of 1:56.3 which set a world record for a three-year-old pacer on a half mile track. He also won the 1989 Hambletonian Oaks with Park Avenue Kathy, and drove six horses to Breeders Crown championships.

In 1990, Nickells along with Gene Riegle, were awarded the Glen Garnsey Trophy as the U.S. Trainer of the Year. Although the NTRA did not track statistics early in Nickells' career, he earned at least $6 million in prize money as a driver and more than $7 million as a trainer.

== Family ==
Nickells was a resident of Lighthouse Point, Florida during his racing career. Nickells was married for over 50 years to his wife Joanne, who died in 2007. They had two children, a son named Sep and a daughter named Brooke. Brooke Nickells, who is also a harness training trainer and driver, almost became the first woman to drive a horse in the Hambletonian Stakes in 2001. The owners of her horse, Lavecster, however, who Brooke had driven to five wins, chose to have Mike Lachance drive the horse instead. Bruce had a brother, Wayne, who also drove and trained harness horses. Wayne died in 2009.
