= Romeo Hanover =

American Standardbred racehorse

- Breed: Standardbred
- Sire: Dancer Hanover (USA)
- Grandsire: Adios (USA)
- Dam: Romola Hanover (USA)
- Damsire: Tar Heel (USA)
- Sex: Stallion
- Foaled: 1963
- Died: 1988
- Country: United States
- Colour: Chestnut
- Breeder: Hanover Shoe Farms
- Owner: Jerry Silverman & Morton Finder
- Trainer: Jerry Silverman
- Record: 44: 36-2-4
- Earnings: $658,505

Major wins
- Fox Stakes (1965); Roosevelt Pace (1965); Battle of Saratoga (1966); Hanover Stakes (3YO) (1966); Reynolds Memorial (1966); Cane Pace (1966); Messenger Stakes (1966); Little Brown Jug (1966)

Awards
- 1965 USA 2 Year Old Colt Pacer of the Year; 1966 USA 3YO C&G Pacer of the Year; USA 4YO H&G Pacer of the Year

Honors
- United States Harness Racing Hall of Fame Immortal (2005)
- Last updated on September 24, 2016

Romeo Hanover (1963–1988) was a Standardbred racehorse won became the third horse to ever win the Triple Crown of Harness Racing for Pacers.

Trained by Jerry Silverman, during his career Romeo Hanover was driven by William Myer, George Sholty, Stanley Dancer and Del Miller. In 2005 he was inducted into the United States Harness Racing Hall of Fame
