= Match racing =

Head-to-head race between two competitors

A match race is a race between two competitors, going head-to-head.

In sailboat racing it is differentiated from a fleet race, which almost always involves three or more competitors competing against each other, and team racing where teams consisting of 2, 3 or 4 boats compete together in a team race, with their results being combined.

In horse racing, it has historically been a format used for one-off events, but in 2009 IMRA, the International Match Race Association was created to enable anyone to enter a one-on-one horse race in all-terrain half-mile loops.

== Sailing ==
The America's Cup is an international competition in sailing which is broadcast worldwide. There are three single races or the equivalent of three games in most other sports. America's Cup is a category of sailing called match racing in which two similar boats go head to head in a race or set of races to decide which boat has the better crew competing on board. In sailing there are three main ways of competing in order to find the best sailor, crew or boat. These are fleet racing, match racing and team racing; all of which are managed by the same governing body (ISAF), though each has slightly different rules.

== History ==
The grounds for match racing were originally set about one hundred and forty four years ago when the first America's Cup was set to take place. The match racing rules were set so that you could have two similar boats within a box rule, which specifies a maximum overall size for boats in the class, as well as features such as stability, that could go head to head in attempt to find the best sailing crews and teams. These rules allow one boat to try to attack the other by getting the other boat penalized so that it has to do what is called three sixty (this is turning the boat three hundred and sixty degrees around or as the rule that states, one tack and one gibe in the same direction), which puts the penalized boat at a large disadvantage compared to the others. After the America's Cup, the first real match race took place at the Omega Gold Cup in Bermuda in the year 1937. It was considered the first real match race because it was sailed in one design boats (boats that are all exactly identical as they were built and managed by the same people), while the America's Cup is a box rule which allows each of the boats to be different speeds. The skipper whom won this regatta was Briggs Cunningham. Briggs Cunningham also won the first America's Cup that was held which incorporated the box rule. Since the Omega Gold Cup was a great success, match racing grew exponentially and created a new form of competitive sailing that had to have its rules managed and standardized. This resulted in The World Match Race Conference, which was a meeting with delegates from all major match racing regattas who decided on the rules and restrictions and who now supervise all match racing regattas.

== How the race is raced ==
The Match Racing course has a very simple setup in comparison to fleet racing. In match racing there are usually four legs, although some events - such as the 2013 America's Cup that has five - may set a different course. Two of the legs are upwind, or sailing against the wind, and the other two legs are downwind, or sailing with the wind. In the first leg the boats are tacking against the wind in order to get to the windward mark the fastest without being penalized while also trying to get the other boats penalized. As their boats and crew get to the windward mark they round it leaving it to starboard, or the right side of the boat. As they go around the mark they cannot touch it, and then they go on to the second leg. On the second leg the boats are going downwind, so they hoist their downwind sails(spinnaker) and go for what is called a gate in sailing, once again trying to get to the gate the fastest by gibing away from the other boat for clear wind or gibing toward another boat to take the opponents wind without getting penalized. A gate in is when there are two marks (buoys) and it is the crew's choice as to which one they will go around once they start the rounding by going between the two marks and finish the rounding with only one mark next to them. When the boats go through the gate they are then on the third leg of the race. The third leg is basically a repeat of the first leg where they beat upwind going towards the windward mark. Once the boats round the windward mark again they are on the fourth and final leg where they race downwind towards the finish in hope of winning.

== Match racing in sailing ==
A match race in sailing involves two boats racing, and contrasts with fleet racing (at least 3 boats, often many, all racing against each other) and team racing (two teams of 2, 3, or 4 boats per team).

=== Tactics ===
With a large enough fleet, the winning boat will generally be the one that finds the fastest possible way around the course. In contrast, match racers will only concentrate on crossing the line before their opponent: This sometimes means taking a route that's not the fastest possible, for example, in order to slow down their opponent. As a result of this, special pre-start routines have been developed and two other tactics that arise from this mind-set are tight coverage and drawing fouls.

By tight coverage, the lead boat will attempt to stay as close as possible to its opponent while staying in front. For example, if on a downwind leg the losing boat gybes toward the right side of the course, the winning boat will gybe toward the right side of the course as well, even though the left side of the course appears to be favored. That way the winning boat is insured against losing the lead due to a wind shift that favors the right side of the course. In fleet racing there will often be boats on both sides of the course, requiring the lead boat to sail on the side that it considers to be fastest.

Drawing fouls is also an important part of match racing. As fouls in sailboat racing penalize the offending boat, but do not advantage the fouled boat, drawing a foul in fleet racing is almost always a net loss. However, when there are only two boats on the course any penalty for one boat is an advantage for the other. Therefore, in match racing a boat will often try to put itself in a position where the other boat will have no option but to foul it or make a disadvantageous change in course, even at the cost of sailing a slower course.

=== Events ===
Most match racing is between one-design boats, meaning that ideally the boats should perform identically on all points of sail and that any differences in performance are attributable to the crew. The design of America's Cup Class boats is controlled by a complex formula which allows designers a fair bit of room to optimize for different expected conditions. This has resulted in boats that do not perform identically on all points of sail, which opens up another match racing tactic of forcing the opponent onto an unfavored point of sail. During the 2003 America's Cup Challenger Series between Oracle BMW Racing and Alinghi, for example, the Alinghi boat was heavier but more powerful and favored on higher points of sail downwind. Alinghi used the tactic of getting to leeward of Oracle on a downwind leg and forcing her up onto a course where Alinghi was comparatively faster, although Alinghi herself could have sailed faster to the finish line on a lower course.

In the Olympics match racing was introduced during the 1992 Olympics in Barcelona, Spain. The match racing took place in the Soling after selection races in fleet race format also in the Soling. This discipline was continued for the 1996 and 2000 Olympics. A new event for 2012 was the Women’s Keelboat Match Racing, using the Elliott 6m.

The World Match Racing Tour is the world's pre-eminent monohull match racing series. It is sanctioned by the International Sailing Federation (ISAF) with 'Special Event ' status.

The Tour comprises a series of 9 events which cross 3 continents during the season combining the adrenaline fuelled excitement of match racing with close to shore racing which provides spectacular heart of the action views for the on shore audience. The championship series uses identical locally supplied racing yachts and includes such world class sailing venues as: Marseille, St. Moritz, Portimao, Kuala Terengganu, Gyeonggi and Hamilton.

The World Match Racing Tour has a history dating back to its establishment in 1988 and draws on the heritage of one of the earliest match racing events, the King Edward VII Gold Cup, first held in the City of Hamilton, Bermuda, in 1937. The Bermuda Gold Cup remains an annual event and a key stage of the World Match Racing Tour.

The Women's International Match Racing Series (WIM Series), the first and only professional sailing series for women, was started in 2013 by the Women's International Match Racing Association (WIMRA). The WIM Series consists of 4-5 events per year throughout the world.

Other notable match racing events in sailing include the Canada's Cup and the Richardson Trophy, both held on the Great Lakes. The Richardson Trophy is governed and sponsored by the Yacht Racing Union of the Great Lakes.

The'Granddaddy of Match Racing' is the Congressional Cup, held at the Long Beach Yacht Club every Spring, It features 5 days of racing on identical 37 foot Catalinas that were purpose-built for this event by Frank Butler. The race is sailed off of the Belmont Pier in Long Beach, CA, and attracts many Sailors who go on to compete in the America's Cup.<https://thecongressionalcup.com> Recent winners of the Congressional Cup.

- 2023 - Chris Poole (USA)
- 2024 - Chris Poole (USA)
- 2025 - Eric Monnin (SUI)
- 2026 - Cole Tapper (AUS)

The San Francisco Perpetual Challenge Trophy, the second-oldest match racing championship, was first contested on San Francisco Bay in 1895, with the Encinal Yacht Club's El Sueno defeating the San Francisco Yacht Club's Queen by 11 minutes over a 15-mile course. The 2012 event saw the San Francisco Yacht Club's classic Bird boat, Robin, defeat the Corinthian Yacht Club's Polly in a best-of-three match sailed on September 15. Robin was skippered by 2002 US Rolex Yachtswoman of the Year Liz Baylis.

== Match races in horse racing ==
Famous horse racing match races include:

- 1823 match race at Union Course on Long Island of 3 heats, 4 miles each between American Eclipse and Sir Henry, won by American Eclipse;
- the 1851 match at York between The Derby winners The Flying Dutchman and Voltigeur;
- 1854 match race at Metairie Race Course in New Orleans between Lexington and Lecomte, won by Lexington;
- 1877 "Great Race" 2½-mile run by a trio of champions: Ten Broeck, Tom Ochiltree and Parole that shut down the U.S. Congress for a day and is depicted in a four-ton stone bas relief sculpted in stone hanging over the clubhouse entrance at Pimlico;
- the 1878 four mile long race in Louisville between the Eastern U.S. colt Ten Broeck and California filly Mollie McCarty that inspired the song Molly and Tenbrooks;
- the Canadian contest between Man o' War and Sir Barton in 1920, won by Man O'War;
- Seabiscuit's 4 length victory over War Admiral in the 1938 Pimlico Special;
- on September 19, 1942 Alsab won by a nose over Whirlaway at Narragansett Park;
- the 1955 race between Nashua and Swaps;
- the 1966 Pace of the Century between standardbred champs Bret Hanover and Cardigan Bay;
- and 1975's tragedy-marred contest between colt Foolish Pleasure and filly Ruffian at Belmont Park. Ruffian broke down in the backstretch and was euthanized; her remains were buried in the Belmont Park infield.
- In 1986, a specially arranged match race between the recent Cheltenham Gold Cup winner Dawn Run and the recent Queen Mother Champion Chase winner Buck House at Punchestown Racecourse in Ireland.

== See also ==
- Racing Rules of Sailing
