= Harness Tracks of America Driver of the Year =

American harness racing award

The Harness Tracks of America Driver of the Year is an American harness racing award for drivers of Standardbred racehorses. Created in 1968, it is awarded annually.

With ten wins, Hervé Filion has won this award more than any other driver.

Past winners:

- 2022 : Dexter Dunn
- 2021 : Jorma Kontio
- 2020 : Dexter Dunn
- 2019 : Dexter Dunn
- 2018 : Aaron Merriman
- 2017 : Yannick Gingras
- 2016 : David Miller
- 2015 : David Miller
- 2014 : Yannick Gingras
- 2013 : Dave Palone
- 2012 : Tim Tetrick
- 2011 : George Brennan
- 2010 : George Brennan
- 2009 : Jody Jamieson / Dave Palone
- 2008 : Tim Tetrick
- 2007 : Tim Tetrick
- 2006 : Tony Morgan
- 2005 : Catello Manzi
- 2004 : Dave Palone
- 2003 : Dave Palone
- 2002 : Tony Morgan
- 2001 : Stephane Bouchard
- 2000 : Dave Palone
- 1999 : Dave Palone
- 1998 : Walter Case, Jr.
- 1997 : Tony Morgan
- 1996 : Tony Morgan / Luc Ouellette
- 1995 : Luc Ouellette
- 1994 : Dave Magee
- 1993 : Jack Moiseyev
- 1992 : Walter Case, Jr.
- 1991 : Walter Case, Jr.
- 1990 : John Campbell
- 1989 : Hervé Filion
- 1988 : John Campbell
- 1987 : Michel Lachance
- 1986 : Michel Lachance
- 1985 : Michel Lachance
- 1984 : Bill O'Donnell
- 1983 : John Campbell
- 1982 : Bill O'Donnell
- 1981 : Hervé Filion
- 1980 : Ron Waples
- 1979 : Ron Waples
- 1978 : Carmine Abbatiello / Hervé Filion
- 1977 : Donald Dancer
- 1976 : Hervé Filion
- 1975 : Joe O'Brien
- 1974 : Hervé Filion
- 1973 : Hervé Filion
- 1972 : Hervé Filion
- 1971 : Hervé Filion
- 1970 : Hervé Filion
- 1969 : Hervé Filion
- 1968 : Stanley Dancer

== See also ==
- Eclipse Award for Outstanding Jockey
