= Beach Towel =

Beach Towel may refer to:

- Beach Towel (towel), a type of towel
- Beach Towel (horse), a racing horse
