= Strike Out =

American Standardbred racehorse

- Breed: Standardbred
- Sire: Bret Hanover (US)
- Grandsire: Adios (US)
- Dam: Golden Miss (US)
- Damsire: Ensign Hanover (US)
- Sex: Stallion
- Foaled: 1969
- Died: July 4, 1998
- Country: United States
- Colour: Chestnut
- Breeder: Castleton Stud
- Owner: Beejay Stable
- Trainer: John Hayes
- Record: 44: 29-9-1
- Earnings: $454,064

Major wins
- Roosevelt Futurity (1971); Florida Breeders (2YO) (1971); Hanover Stakes (2YO) (1971); Adios Pace (1972); Prix d'Été (1972); Battle of Saratoga (1972); Best of All (1972); Geers Stakes (1972); Hanover Stakes (3YO) (1972); Reynolds Memorial (1972); Gaines Memorial (1972); Tattersalls (1972); Beaver Pace (1972); Florida Breeders (3YO) (1972); Little Brown Jug (1972)

Awards
- 1971 USA 2 Year Old Colt Pacer of the Year; 1971 CTA 2 Year Old Colt Pacer of the Year; 1972 USA 3YO C&G Pacer of the Year

Honors
- Canadian Horse Racing Hall of Fame (1976)

Strike Out (1969–1998) was a Standardbred North American Harness racing champion.

== Background ==
Strike Out was foaled in 1969 at Castleton Farm in Lexington, Kentucky, and is by Bret Hanover out of the mare Golden Miss.

He was purchased at a yearling auction for $15,000 by Beejay Stables of Oshawa, Ontario, a partnership between harness-racing trainer/driver John Hayes and Montreal, Quebec, textile executives, the Shapiro brothers, Robert, Conrad, and Leo. For Hayes, who recognized the horse's talent, it was an opportunity for which he had been waiting a long time.

== Racing career ==
As a two-year-old pacer, Strike Out earned more money than any horse in his age group and was named by Harness Tracks of America (HTA) and the United States Trotting Association (USTA) as the top harness horse his age in North America. In 1972 he became the first horse to win a Canadian harness race with a $100,000 purse. That year he went on to race in the United States, capturing the important Adios Stakes in a dead heat with Jay Time, the Fox Stake, the Roosevelt Futurity, the Beaver Pace and other major races all over North America, including the Prix d'Été at Montreal's Blue Bonnets Raceway. By the end of the summer, his owners had set their sights on the most prestigious race of all, the Little Brown Jug in Delaware, Ohio. Strike Out, was trained by Bruce K. Nickells for two months the previous winter, before he won the Jug with a time of 1:56.3 which set a world record for a three-year-old pacer on a half mile track.

On September 21, 1972, driven by Keith Waples, Strike Out became the first Canadian owned horse to win the Little Brown Jug. Not only did he do it in straight heats, but he won setting a world record over a half-mile track for a 3-year-old pacer in a time of 1:56 3/5. Strike Out was named by the HTA and USTA as top three-year-old.

== Stud career ==
After compiling a 29-9-1 record in 44 races, Strike Out was retired to stud at the end of the 1972 season. While retaining a half interest in him, Beejay Stables sold the $15,000 bargain-basement colt for $1.5 million. His son, Striking Image became the first 2 year old Standardbred Horse ever to run a mile in the time of 1:55. Strike Out also went on to sire 1979 Jug winner Hot Hitter.

In 1976 Strike Out was part of the inaugural class inducted into the Canadian Horse Racing Hall of Fame.

Strike Out died on July 4, 1998, and was buried in the horse cemetery at Castleton Farms.

== Pedigree ==
Pedigree of Strike Out, chestnut colt, 1969
Sire Bret Hanover	Adios	Hal Dale	Abbedale
Sire Bret Hanover	Adios	Hal Dale	Margaret Hal
Sire Bret Hanover	Adios	Adioo Volo	Adioo Guy
Sire Bret Hanover	Adios	Adioo Volo	Sigrid Volo
Sire Bret Hanover	Brenna Hanover	Tar Heel	Billy Direct
Sire Bret Hanover	Brenna Hanover	Tar Heel	Leta Long
Sire Bret Hanover	Brenna Hanover	Beryl Hanover	Nibble Hanover
Sire Bret Hanover	Brenna Hanover	Beryl Hanover	Laura Hanover
Dam Golden Miss	Ensign Hanover	Billy Direct	Napoleon Direct
Dam Golden Miss	Ensign Hanover	Billy Direct	Gay Forbes
Dam Golden Miss	Ensign Hanover	Helen Hanover	Dillon Volo
Dam Golden Miss	Ensign Hanover	Helen Hanover	Helen Dillon
Dam Golden Miss	Miss Pluto Scott	McKinney Scott	Peter Scott
Dam Golden Miss	Miss Pluto Scott	McKinney Scott	Diabla McKinney
Dam Golden Miss	Miss Pluto Scott	Lu Dene Pluto	Peter Pluto
Dam Golden Miss	Miss Pluto Scott	Lu Dene Pluto	Morganetta
