= Prix d'Été =

- Logo in 2019.
- Location: Trois-Rivières, Quebec; Canada
- Inaugurated: 1966
- Race type: Harness race for standardbred pacers
- Website: hippodrome3r.ca

Race information
- Distance: 1 mile (1,609 metres or 8 furlongs)
- Surface: Dirt
- Track: Hippodrome 3R
- Qualification: 4yo pacers
- Purse: $500,000 (2019)

Prix d'Été (English: Summer Classic) is a horse racing event for four-year-old Standardbred pacers held annually in Canada, at Hippodrome 3R of Trois-Rivières, Quebec.

== History ==
This event was held for the first time in 1966 under the name of Prix d'Automne (Autumn Classic) at the now defunct Blue Bonnets Raceway in Montreal. Run over a distance of one mile on a 5/8 mile oval track, the race was open to pacers age four and older. A $50,000 purse made it the richest harness race at that time in Canadian history. In 1967 the race was renamed the L'Amble du Centenaire (Centennial Pace) in honor of Canada's 100th anniversary and made open to pacers age three and older. In 1968 it became the Prix d'Été and in 1971 was modified to a stake race for three-year-old pacers.

=== Cancellation and Revival ===
The Prix d'Été was one of the top harness races in North America until 1992. The 1993 edition had to be cancelled due to a five-month strike action by horsemen. Deemed as no longer viable, the owners decided to close the track but in 1995 a municipal government corporation, Le Société d'habitation et de développement de Montréal (SHDM), purchased the track and renamed it Hippodrome de Montréal. Taken over and operated by the provincial government agency SONACC (Société nationale du cheval de course), but eventually withdrew its support and placed their operating company under bankruptcy protection on October 13, 2009, and permanently closed the facility.

The Prix d'Été was not held again until being revived in 2014 at Hippodrome 3R in Trois-Rivières as a race for four-year-olds. With a purse of $500,000 in 2019, it became the most remunerative race in North America for four-year-old pacers.

== Records ==
Most wins by a driver:

- 2 - Keith Waples (1972, 1975)
- 2 - Michel Lachance (1988, 1989)
- 2 - Yannick Gingras (2014, 2016)

Most wins by a trainer:

- 6 – Billy Haughton (1967, 1970, 1974)

Stakes record:

- 1:50 3/5 – Sunfire Blue Chip (2014) & All Bets Off (2015)

== Prix d'Été winners ==
Year	Winner	Age	Driver	Trainer	Owner	Time	Purse
2016	Rockin Ron	4	Yannick Gingras	Ron Burke	Burke Racing Stable LLC	1:52 0/0	$200,000
2015	All Bets Off	4	Matt Kakaley	Ron Burke	Burke Racing Stable LLC	1:50 3/5	$200,000
2014	Sunfire Blue Chip	4	Yannick Gingras	Jimmy Takter	Christina Takter, Brixton Medical AB, et al.	1:50 3/5	$200,000
1993	2013	Race not held					
1992	Direct Flight	3	John Campbell	Kelvin Harrison	Joseph Alflen	1:52 1/5	$307,400
1991	Die Laughing	3	Richard Silverman	Jerry Silverman	Alnoff Stable & Val D'Or Farms	1:51 2/5	$603,500
1990	Beach Towel	3	Ray Remmen	Larry Remmen	Uptown Stable	1:53 1/5	$663,500
1989	Goalie Jeff	3	Michel Lachance	Tom Artandi	Centre Ice Stable	1:52 1/5	$632,500
1988	Matt's Scooter	3	Michel Lachance	Harry J. Poulton	Gordon & Illa Rumpel, Charles Juravinski	1:54 4/5	$582,000
1987	Frugal Gourmet	3	Trevor Ritchie	Blair Burgess	Excellent Stable	1:53 3/5	$548,000
1986	Armbro Emerson	3	Walter Whelan	Brian Burton	Ed Weisz & Light Heavy Weight Stable	1:56 0/0	$527,500
1985	Falcon Seelster	3	Tom Harmer	Tom Harmer	Ciara Stable & Charles Day	1:53 2/5	$358,000
1984	Butler BG	3	Ted Wing	Camilla Stanfield	Lawrence Cadish	1:53 4/5	$411,500
1983	Ralph Hanover	3	Ron Waples	Stewart Firlotte	Ron Waples, Pointsetta Stables, Grants Direct Stables	1:54 0/0	$411,500
1982	Cam Fella	3	Pat Crowe	Pat Crowe	Norman Clements & Norman Faulkner	1:55 1/5	$377,000
1981	Seahawk Hanover	3	Ben Webster	Samuel "Skip" Lewis	Dave Harris, Samuel Lewis, et al.	1:55 3/5	$226,100
1980	Niatross	3	Clint Galbraith	Clint Galbraith	Niatross Syndicate	1:53 4/5	$161,650
1979	Hot Hitter	3	Hervé Filion	Louis Meittinis	Solomon Katz, S A J & Alterman Stables	1:54 0/0	$181,150
1978	Abercrombie	3	Glen Garnsey	Glen Garnsey	L. Keith Bulen & Shirley A. Mitchell	1:55 4/5	$150,750
1977	Governor Skipper	3	John Chapman	H. "Bucky" Norris	Ivanhoe Stable	1:54 3/5	$154,750
1976	Precious Fella	3	Gary Cameron	Del Cameron	Oscar & Michael Kimmelman, et al.	1:56 4/5	$163,700
1975	Albert's Star	3	Keith Waples	Keith Waples	Seiling Stable	1:58 0/0	$140,000
1974	Armbro Omaha	3	Peter Haughton	Billy Haughton	Armstrong Brothers Stables	1:57 4/5	$150,000
1973	Armbro Nadir	3	Nelson White	Nelson White	Dr. Donald Davis	1:56 1/5	$130,000
1972	Strike Out	3	Keith Waples	John Hayes	Beejay Stable	1:58 2/5	$100,000
1971	Albatross	3	Stanley Dancer	Stanley Dancer	Amicable Stable	1:57 2/5	$75,000
1970	Laverne Hanover	4	George Sholty	Billy Haughton	Thomas W. Murphy, Jr.	1:57 2/5	$75,000
1969	Race not held						
1968	True Duane	5	Norman "Chris" Boring	Leon Boring	Richard Oldfield	1:58 0/0	$50,000
1967	Romulus Hanover	3	Billy Haughton	Billy Haughton	Farmstead Acres Farm	1:57 1/5	$50,000
1966	Bret Hanover	4	Frank Ervin	Frank Ervin	Richard Downing	1:59 0/0	$50,000
