= Two Gaits Farm (Carmel, Indiana) =

Coordinates: 39.9999°N 86.1459°W

Two Gaits Farm is the name of a Standardbred (harness racing) horse farm that functioned from 1934 to 1973. It belonged to Leo C. McNamara Sr. and at one time was internationally known as the largest standardbred pacer breeding farm in the country. The farm was the birthplace of numerous famous horses over the years. In the early 1950s there were over 500 horses being cared for on the farm.

== History ==
In 1934, Leo C. McNamara Sr. of Indianapolis, Indiana, purchased a 100-acre farm northwest of Carmel, Indiana. The horse farm was initially acquired as a hobby, but was continually added to over the years and eventually consisted of 700 acres. The family permanently moved there in the summer of 1940. The name "Two Gaits Farm" refers to the trotter and pacer gaits of the Standardbred (harness horse).

McNamara and his wife had one daughter and nine sons who grew up on the farm and helped raise the horses. They were also put to work maintaining stables, pastures and miles of freshly painted white fences. The family lived in the red brick farmhouse, built in 1861, which is still standing today.

In August 1973, the McNamaras sold the entire remaining farm acreage to Ralph Wilfong. The family home was sold in the early 1990s. What remains of Two Gaits Farm was sold to Jeffrey and Beth Weisgerber in 2011. Horses still live on the property.

== Breeding ==
Brood mares were sent from all over the United States and Canada to be bred with the Two Gaits stallions. The south part of the farm, which spread from what is now Bennett Road south to 136th Street, was reserved for outside owned horses exclusively. This was done as a health measure in order to control any disease that an incoming mare might carry.

Every year, in late August, the McNamaras prepared about 50 weanlings, colts and fillies to sell at the Yearling Sales in Lexington, Kentucky and Harrisburg, Pennsylvania. Horsemen would come from around the country to examine and view these yearlings during the State Fair's Grand Circuit Race meeting in Indianapolis.

=== Famous horses ===
- Hal Dale (1926–1955)

Born to Sire Abbedale & Dam Margaret Hal in 1926 in New Ross, Indiana. He was purchased from the McClintock's of Frankfort, Ind. He is known as the "grand daddy" of all the great pacers in the last 45 years. He started a new blood line of pacers, who went on to become champions in their own right. He was the sire of Adios, Irish Hal, Kitty Hal, Dale Frost and Hal Senator. In the beginning his stud fee was $50 but as he produced offspring that won races, his stud fees topped $5,000. He died on October 16, 1955. He was inducted into the United States Trotting & Pacing Hall of Fame in Goshen, New York.

- Adios (1940–1965)

Born at Two Gaits Farm, he was sold at auction in Lexington, KY in 1941. His price of $2000 for a yearling was a record at that time. At one time, he was owned by Harry Warner of Warner Bros. Pictures. Later, Hanover Shoe Farm in Pennsylvania purchased him for $500,000, another record price for a stallion. As a stud, he went on to surpass his father, Hal Dale, in producing the most offspring that raced a mile in two minutes or better.

== Village of Mt. Carmel ==
In the mid-1950s, McNamara decided to develop a planned community that would provide a farm-type atmosphere in which to raise a family. A complete survey was made of the farm and a noted community development architect laid out a master plan for a new community that would be known as the Village of Mt. Carmel. He obtained water and sewer franchise from the state of Indiana systems for this community. They were the first privately owned facilities of that nature in Hamilton County. The private water system was still used for the VOMC until 2002. The reputation of Two Gaits Farm put Carmel on the map and helped home sales in the new community.

In 1955, McNamara donated money and 11 acres of land to the Diocese of Lafayette in Indiana for the building of a church and school. The church, at the corner of 146th and Oakridge Road, was named Our Lady of Mt. Carmel and was completed in 1956. It has grown substantially and now serves over 13,000 families and includes the Matthew 25 Help Center and Trinity Clinic.

McNamara died in 1959 but the development continued. He was the first to be buried at that church.

When the farm was sold to Ralph Wilfong in 1973, he went on to develop Sections 6, 7 and 9 expanding the floor plans from the typical ranch style home common in sections 1–5, to include the Tri-Level and Two Floor plans that are very common in the rest of Mt. Carmel. Section 8, known as the 'new' section, began development in 1995.

He took the farm property north of 146th Street and made a new subdivision. He named it The Village Farms, keeping with McNamara's dream of a farm-type community. Wilfong was a developer by profession, and a lover of horses. He moved into the old brick home which had formerly been the Stud Manager's tenant home between Adios Pass and Village Drive North, on 146th street in 1973, and lived there until his death in the mid-1990s. In 2003, a few remaining acres became John Paul Way and section 10 was created.

In the early 1940s, McNamara built a ½ mile clay-training track between what is now Harmony Road and Adios Pass. This was removed for the housing development in the late 1970s and relocated just north of 146th Street until the mid-1990s, when The Village Farms portion of the original Two Gaits Farm was developed.

=== Notable street names ===
- Bennett Rd. was named after Bishop Bennett who was the first Bishop of the Diocese of Lafayette in Indiana.
- Village Dr. was named to signify the 'village' or tight knit community that McNamara envisioned for The Village of Mt. Carmel. In the original plans for the neighborhood, developers wanted the layout to resemble the shape of a rosary. The main north–south street and Bennett Road and Adios Pass semi-accomplished this.
- Park View Rd. was named after the park surrounding the water tower that used to stand near the corner of Park View Road and Adios Pass. The park sat on 4 acres of land and was used as a central meeting place for the families and friends of village residents. The gatherings became annual traditions for some of the residents of Mt. Carmel. New homes have since been built in that area and a new park developed with a swimming pool and tennis courts.
- Meadowview Ct. was named after Meadow Downs Race Track in Pennsylvania.
- Hamp Ct. was named after a friend of McNamara's. They were Directors of the United States Trotting Association (USTA) together where McNamara was also a founder. His full name was Max Hamp.
- Colby Ct. was named after the pacer stallion, Colby Hanover who produced several champion pacers.
- Haldale Dr. was named after Hal Dale, Two Gaits' first stud and premier stallion for the farm.
- Adios Pass was named after Adios, one of the prize offspring of Two Gaits Farm.
- Painter Ct. was named after the pacer stallion, Painter. He produced several above-average pacers, but did not compare to Hal Dale or Adios as a prize stud. Painter was sold to the Castleton Farm of Lexington, Kentucky, when Two Gaits Farm was disbanded.
- Love Ct. and Song Ct. were named after Love Song, a brood mare that produced many champion trotters.

== See also ==
- Harness Racing Museum & Hall of Fame
