= Western Dreamer =

American Standardbred racehorse (1994–2026)

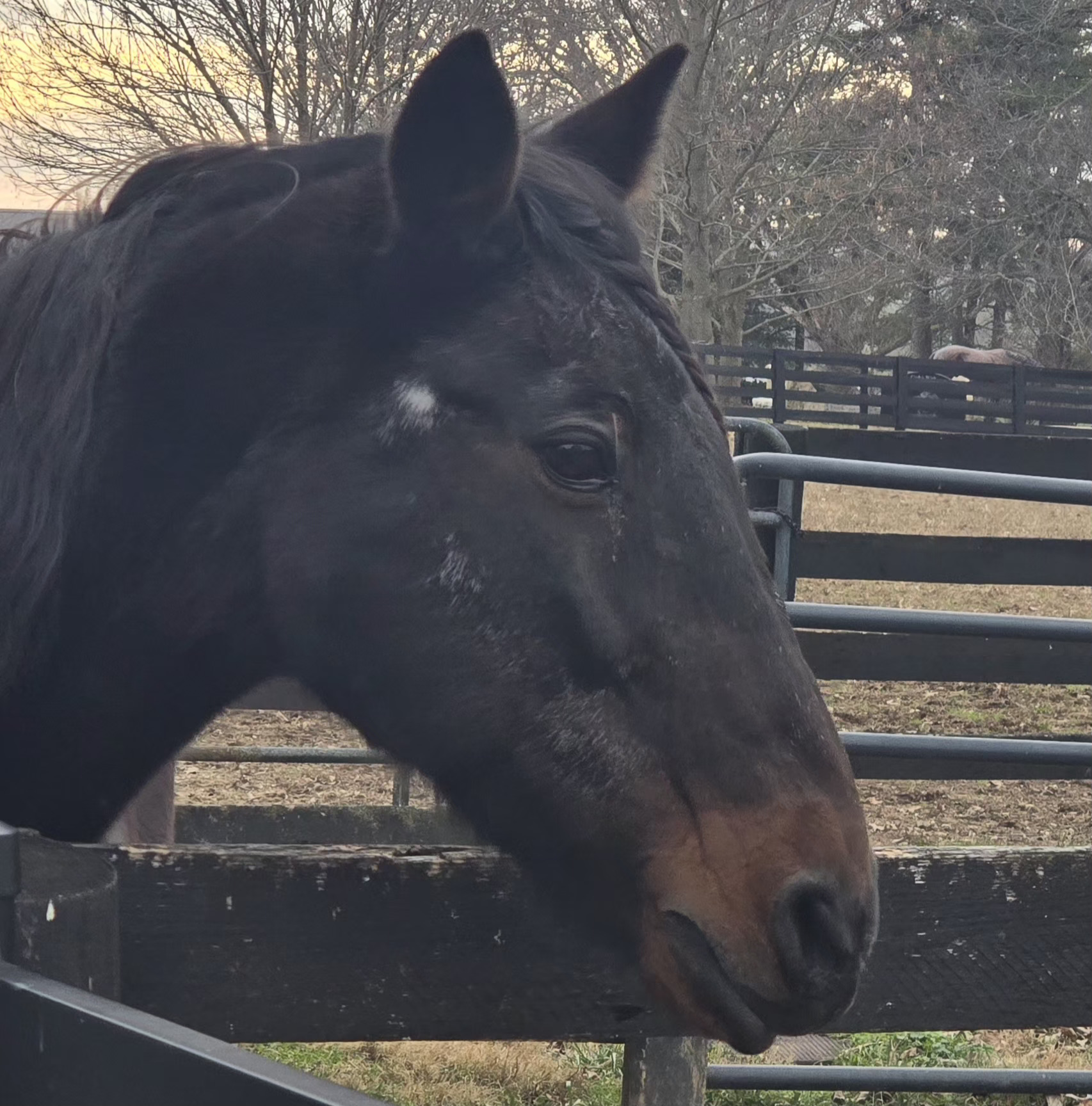
- Western Dreamer in 2026
- Breed: Standardbred
- Sire: Western Hanover (USA)
- Grandsire: No Nukes (USA)
- Dam: Fits Of Fun (USA)
- Damsire: Panorama (USA)
- Sex: Gelding
- Foaled: April 25, 1994
- Died: March 24, 2026 (aged 31)
- Country: United States
- Colour: Bay
- Breeder: Kentuckiana Farm
- Owner: Matthew, Patrick Jr., & Daniel Daly
- Trainer: William Robinson
- Earnings: $1,812,176

Major wins
- Art Rooney Memorial Pace (1997); U.S. Pacing Championship (1998); Battle of Lake Erie Pace (1998); U.S. Pacing Triple Crown wins: Cane Pace (1997); Little Brown Jug (1997); Messenger Stakes (1997)

Awards
- United States Pacer of the Year (1997); Canadian Harness Horse of the Year (1997)

Honors
- Hall of Champions at the Kentucky Horse Park (2001)
- Last updated on 7 November 2016

Western Dreamer (April 25, 1994 – March 24, 2026) was an American Standardbred racehorse, foaled in Georgetown, Kentucky, who won the U.S. Pacing Triple Crown in 1997. Driven by Michel Lachance, his winning time of 1:51 1/5 in the Little Brown Jug was the then fastest ever recorded for the race.

Western Dreamer is the only gelding of any breed to ever win a Pacing Triple Crown. In his later years, he was a resident of the Hall of Champions at the Kentucky Horse Park. Western Dreamer died on March 24, 2026, at the age of 31.
