= Hot Hitter =

American Standardbred racehorse

- Breed: Standardbred
- Sire: Strike Out (USA)
- Grandsire: Bret Hanover (USA)
- Dam: Timely Queen (USA)
- Damsire: Good Time (USA)
- Sex: Stallion
- Foaled: 1976
- Country: United States
- Colour: Bay
- Breeder: Castleton Farms & Anthony Tavolacci
- Owner: 1) Alterman Stables, Inc./SAJ Ranch, Ltd./Soloman Katz; 2) Louis P. Guida & Morton Finder
- Trainer: Louis Meittinis
- Earnings: $963,574

Major wins
- Little Brown Jug (1979); Messenger Stakes (1979); Prix d'Été (1979); Adios Pace (1979)

Awards
- 1979 USA 3 Year Old Colt Pacer of the Year
- Last updated on 29 September 2016

Hot Hitter (foaled 1976), a bay Standardbred Champion racehorse, won two of the Pacing Triple Crown races in 1979 while on his way to setting a single-season earnings record of $826,542 for a harness horse.

Purchased as a yearling by trainer Lou Meittinis for the bargain-basement price of $21,000, Hot Hitter eventually was sold to various investors for $6 million.

== Racing career ==
For his important races, Hot Hitter was driven by Harness Racing Hall of Fame inductee Hervé Filion. Racing as a two-year-old, he met with limited success, but at age three developed into the 1979 U.S. Champion three-year-old pacer.

=== Triple Crown races ===
On June 30, 1979, Happy Motoring nipped Hot Hitter at the wire in the first leg of the Triple Crown series, the Cane Pace at Yonkers Raceway. On September 20 at County Fairgrounds in Delaware, Ohio, though, Hot Hitter soundly beat Happy Motoring in the Little Brown Jug, the second leg of the Triple Crown and North America's most prestigious harness race for pacers. The Cane Pace winner finished a distant seventh in the Jug's eight‐horse field. On October 27 at Roosevelt Raceway, Hot Hitter easily won the third leg of the series, the Messenger Stakes.

== World record performance ==
The Prix d'Été, another of the big wins of Hot Hitter's career, took place August 26, 1979, at Blue Bonnets Raceway in Montréal, Québec. His winning time of 1:54 in Canada's then-richest and most important race set a new world record for a 5/8-mile track. While not a world record, Hot Hitter's win in the 1979 Adios Pace was another memorable performance. He won both heats, on a muddy track, in the process defeating Sonsam, who had set a world record for a one-mile oval in winning the July 19 Meadowlands Pace and was widely seen as invincible.

== Stud record ==
Hot Hitter failed a fertility test that led to a $1.3 million insurance payment. As a result, he produced only a small number of offspring. Of his progeny, the best performance was by his gelded son Willie Mays, who won in a time of 1:53.2.
