= Leo C. McNamara =

American businessman and harness racing executive (1897–1968)

Personal information
- Born: Leo Carl McNamara; 1894 Indianapolis, Indiana, U.S.
- Died: April 3, 1959 (aged 64–65) Winter Park, Florida, U.S.
- Occupations: Businessman; horse breeder

Horse racing career
- Sport: Harness racing

Honors
- United States Harness Racing Hall of Fame (1959)

Significant horses
- Hal Dale; Adios; Nimble Colby

Leo C. McNamara (1894 – April 3, 1959) was an American businessman and harness racing executive who built Two Gaits Farm into Indiana's largest harness horse breeding establishment.

== Early life ==
Leo Carl McNamara was born in Indianapolis, Indiana, United States, in 1894.

== Career ==
McNamara entered business in Indianapolis as a young man. He and his father, James E. McNamara, founded a road paving company in Carmel, Indiana in the 1920s. He eventually became president of the James McNamara Construction Company. When his father died on December 6, 1930, he left an estate valued at $120,000.

=== Brewery president ===
In late 1932, McNamara became involved in the redevelopment of the former Mauss Brewery in Indianapolis as an officer of Indiana Brewers, Inc. The company had purchased the brewery, located in the 900 block of East New York Street, and began an extensive remodeling project to prepare the facility for the resumption of beer production amid the repeal of Prohibition. As president, he oversaw the company's operations, including the introduction of its Indiana Club pilsner-style beer in 1933.

=== Two Gaits Farm ===
McNamara acquired a Hamilton County farm property in late 1934 and, after harvesting corn, beans, and tomatoes, began breeding horses there. He established Two Gaits Farm on the property in Carmel, Indiana in 1935. During the mid-1930s, he became active in horse breeding and harness racing. He developed Two Gaits into a nationally known breeding operation for champion trotting and pacing horses.

McNamara selected Hal Dale as the foundation stallion of his breeding operation. The Two Gaits owner spent $2,000 at the 1936 Indianapolis Speed Sale on Hal Dale, who later sired Adios in 1940. He also acquired Athlone Guy from the stock of Abe McClamrock at the auction, along with eight mares.

He was elected president of the Indiana Trotting and Pacing Horse Association in December 1935. He owned several harness racing horses at the time, which were in the Baker-Palin stable at the Senator Farm near Carmel. His and Palin's farms were adjoining and encompassed approximately 750 acres in Clay and Washington townships.

He was chosen as a director of the Trotting Horse Club of America in 1937, joining other prominent business figures involved in harness racing. His election came as the club pursued stricter regulations governing scoring on the Grand Circuit. In September 1938, he was elected to the board of directors of the Hambletonian Society, which sponsors the Hambletonian Stakes. He succeeded the late Charles R. Thompson of Lexington. He was among the original directors of the United States Trotting Association, established in late 1938. The Indianapolis horseman served on the board of directors of District 2, overseeing Lower Michigan and Indiana.

McNamara introduced a new starting gate to the Grand Circuit during the summer of 1939. Although the starting system had been used in Europe for some time, he was the first to introduce it to American tracks.

He served as treasurer of the Kentucky Trots Breeders Association following its organization in 1943. In 1946, he helped revive the Kentucky Futurity at The Red Mile in Lexington, Kentucky after the event for three-year-old trotters had been suspended for four years. McNamara's filly, Nimble Colby, won the 1956 Kentucky Futurity.

McNamara was elected second vice-president of the Grand Circuit in 1944. In 1949, he helped establish the Hall of Fame of the Trotter now known as the Harness Racing Museum & Hall of Fame.

He resigned from the United States Trotting Association in 1954.

His son, Edgar C. McNamara, succeeded him as president of the family construction company following his death in 1959.

== Death ==
Leo C. McNamara Sr. died in Winter Park, Florida, on April 3, 1959.

== Legacy ==
He was posthumously inducted into the United States Harness Racing Hall of Fame in 1959.
