= Adios (horse) =

American Standardbred racehorse

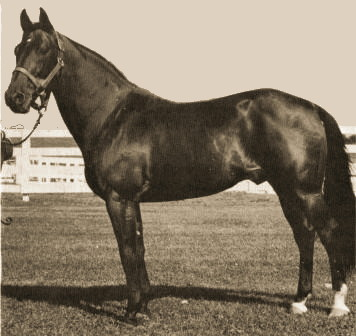
- Breed: Standardbred
- Sire: Hal Dale
- Grandsire: Abbedale
- Dam: Adioo Volo
- Maternal grandsire: Adioo Guy
- Sex: Stallion
- Foaled: 1940
- Country: United States
- Color: Bay
- Breeder: Leo C. McNamara
- Owner: Delvin Miller
- Trainer: Frank Ervin

Record
- 87: 43-?-?

Earnings
- $33,329

Major wins
- 43

Adios (January 3, 1940 – June 22, 1965) was a champion harness racing sire. The son of Hal Dale and the mare Adioo Volo, the horse named Adios was born on January 3, 1940, at Two Gaits Farm, in Carmel, Indiana. Trained and driven by Frank Ervin and for a while owned by Harry Warner of Warner Bros. film studio, Adios was a multiple world champion during his racing career. His pacing record at the Shelbyville, Indiana, fair stood for 43 years. Despite his racing success, he is most famous for his offspring, which included Adios Harry.

In 1948 Adios was purchased by harness racing driver, Delvin Miller, to stand in stud at his Meadow Lands farm near Washington, Pennsylvania. The horse proved to be a tremendous stud, considered by many to be the greatest in harness racing history. He sired eight Little Brown Jug winners, more than any other horse, and his sons, Adios Butler and Bret Hanover both became winners of the Triple Crown of Harness Racing for Pacers. Adios sired 589 offspring in total.

Adios died on June 22, 1965. The horse was buried at Meadow Lands farm under his favorite apple tree near the paddock that had been his home for seventeen years.

His name is synonymous with horse racing and can be found on consumer products and harness horse equipment.

A race was named for him, held each year on the second Saturday in August at The Meadows Racetrack and Casino in Meadow Lands, Pennsylvania. Since the first Delvin Miller Adios in 1967, it has evolved into one of the important events in the harness racing season.

Adios Golf Club in Coconut Creek, Florida, was named after the horse by his owner and club founder Delvin Miller. The course was designed in 1982 by fellow founder Arnold Palmer.

Two Gaits Farm in Carmel, Indiana, where Adios was foaled, was purchased in 2011 by Jeffrey and Beth Weisgerber. Adios Pass, a nearby street, is named after the sulky champion.

== Sire line tree ==
- Adios
  - Adios Harry
  - Adios Butler
  - Dancer Hanover
    - Romeo Hanover
  - Henry T Adios
    - Silent Majority
      - Abercrombie
        - Artsplace
  - Bret Hanover
    - Strike Out
      - Hot Hitter
    - Warm Breeze
      - Falcon Seelster
        - Shady Character

== Bibliography ==
- Hill, Marie (1971). Adios: The Big Daddy of Harness Racing. New York: Arco. ISBN 0-498-07792-6. OCLC 136788.
