= Fleet racing =

Competitive sailboat racing

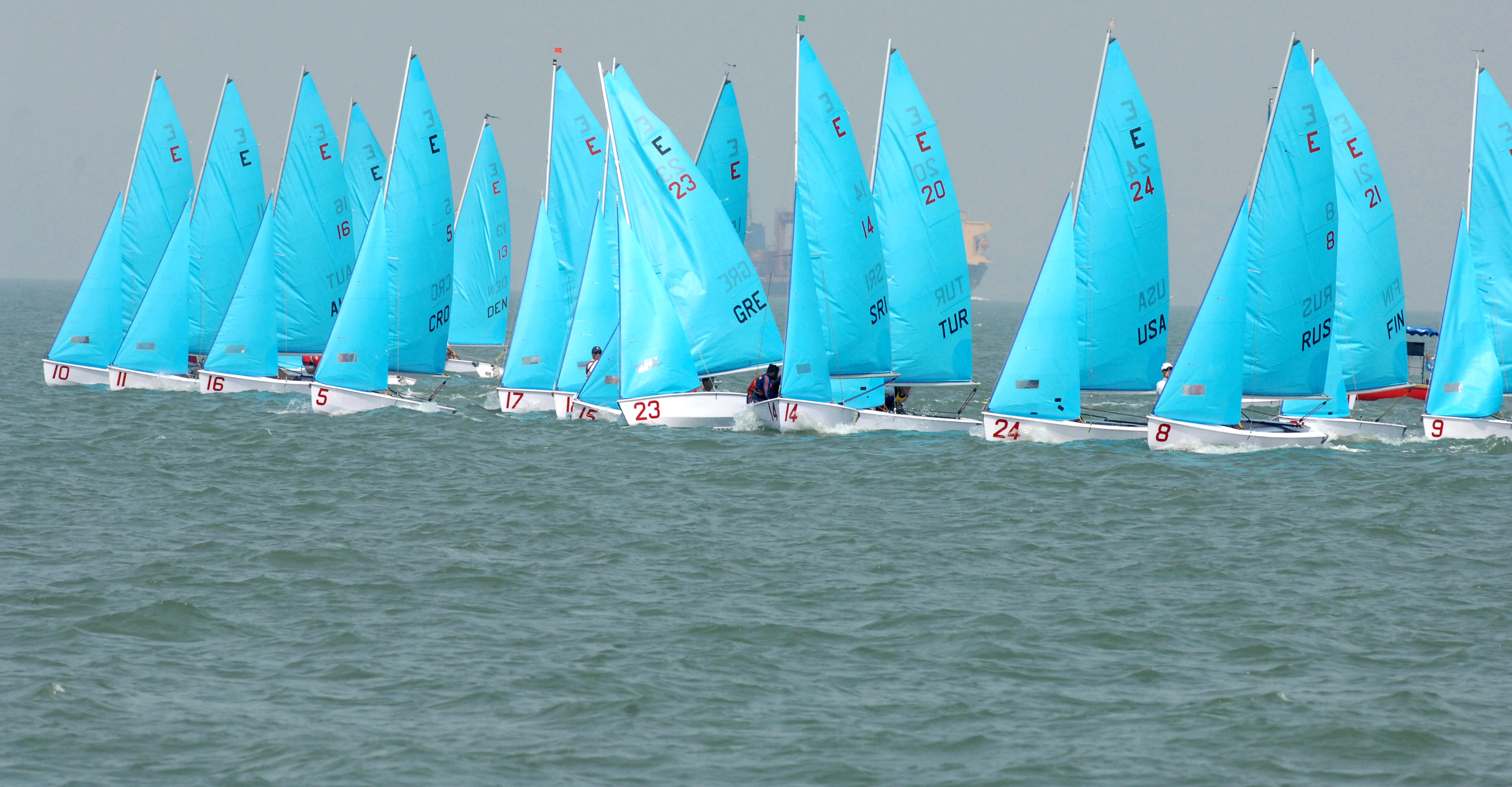
- The start of a fleet race
- Highest governing body: World Sailing

Characteristics
- Contact: No
- Type: Outdoor, Aquatic

Fleet racing is a form of competitive sailing that involves sailboats racing one another over a set course. It is the most common form of sailboat racing and contrasts with match racing and team racing.

Fleet racing can take place in two main formats. In the "One-Design" basis, all boats in the fleet are of the same class (i.e., the same design, length, and sail area). Alternatively, different classes of boats can race on a handicap basis, where faster classes give time to slower classes either by starting the race later or having their finishing times adjusted after the race's completion. Racing can occur around or between buoys or geographical features such as islands, and take place over short inshore courses or long distances offshore (such as the Volvo Ocean Race).

The rules for fleet racing are set by World Sailing and can be supplemented by race-specific rules set by the organisers of a particular race. Contraventions of the rules are resolved either by a boat voluntarily taking a penalty during the race, or by protest lodged and heard after the race. The rules of match racing, on the other hand, are normally enforced by umpires issuing penalties during a race.

Fleet racing involves fewer strategic and tactical considerations for the sailor than match racing. In fleet racing, the most important factor in the outcome of a race is usually the speed of each boat. Three-time Olympic sailing gold medallist Ben Ainslie, who made a foray into match racing for the 2007 America's Cup, has described the differences between fleet racing and match racing as "huge".

In the 2008 Olympics, all eleven sailing events were One-Design fleet races. On the other hand, the America's Cup is sailed as a series of match races.
