= Walter Case Jr. =

American harness racing driver

Walter H. Case Jr. is an American harness racing driver from Maine.

== Career ==
Walter Case Jr. has held several driving records, including the all-time record for most driving wins in one calendar year (1998) with 1,077. (This record was broken on November 27, 2007, by Tim Tetrick). He has won driving titles at many racetracks such as Yonkers Raceway and Northfield Park. He was voted the Harness Tracks of America Driver of the Year in 1991, 1992, and 1998.

== Domestic violence and prison term ==
In 2003, Walter Case Jr. was convicted of stabbing his then-estranged wife with a steak knife. He served four years of a five-year sentence at the Belmont Correctional Institution in Ohio.
