= Horse of the Year =

Horse of the Year is an honor given by various organizations worldwide in harness racing and thoroughbred horse racing.

Some of the awards include:

- American Horse of the Year, also called the Eclipse Award — United States
- American Harness Horse of the Year — United States
- Australian Champion Racehorse of the Year
- Canadian Horse of the Year, also called the Sovereign Award for Horse of the Year award — Canada
- Canadian Harness Horse of the Year — Canada
- European Horse of the Year
- German Horse of the Year — Germany
- Hong Kong Horse of the Year — Hong Kong
- Japanese Horse of the Year — Japan
- New Zealand Horse of the Year — New Zealand
- Equus Award for Horse of the Year — South Africa
- World Thoroughbred Racehorse Rankings, World's Top Ranked Horse

== See also ==
- Horse of the Year Show, annual British indoors horse show
