= Vernon Downs =

Racecourse and entertainment facility in Vernon, New York

- Interactive map of Vernon Downs
- Location: 4229 Stuhlman Rd. Vernon, New York
- Coordinates: 43°04′05″N 75°31′52″W
- Owned by: American Racing and Entertainment LLC
- Date opened: July 1, 1953
- Race type: Harness racing

Vernon Downs is a horse racing track, racino and entertainment facility located in the town of Vernon in central New York, United States. The track was established in 1953 and in 1955 was the location that Adios Harry ran his "Miracle Mile". As tastes changed and competition increased, its attendance and revenues decreased. It has added simulcast harness racing, video gaming, and entertainment, in addition to building a 173-suite hotel.

== History ==
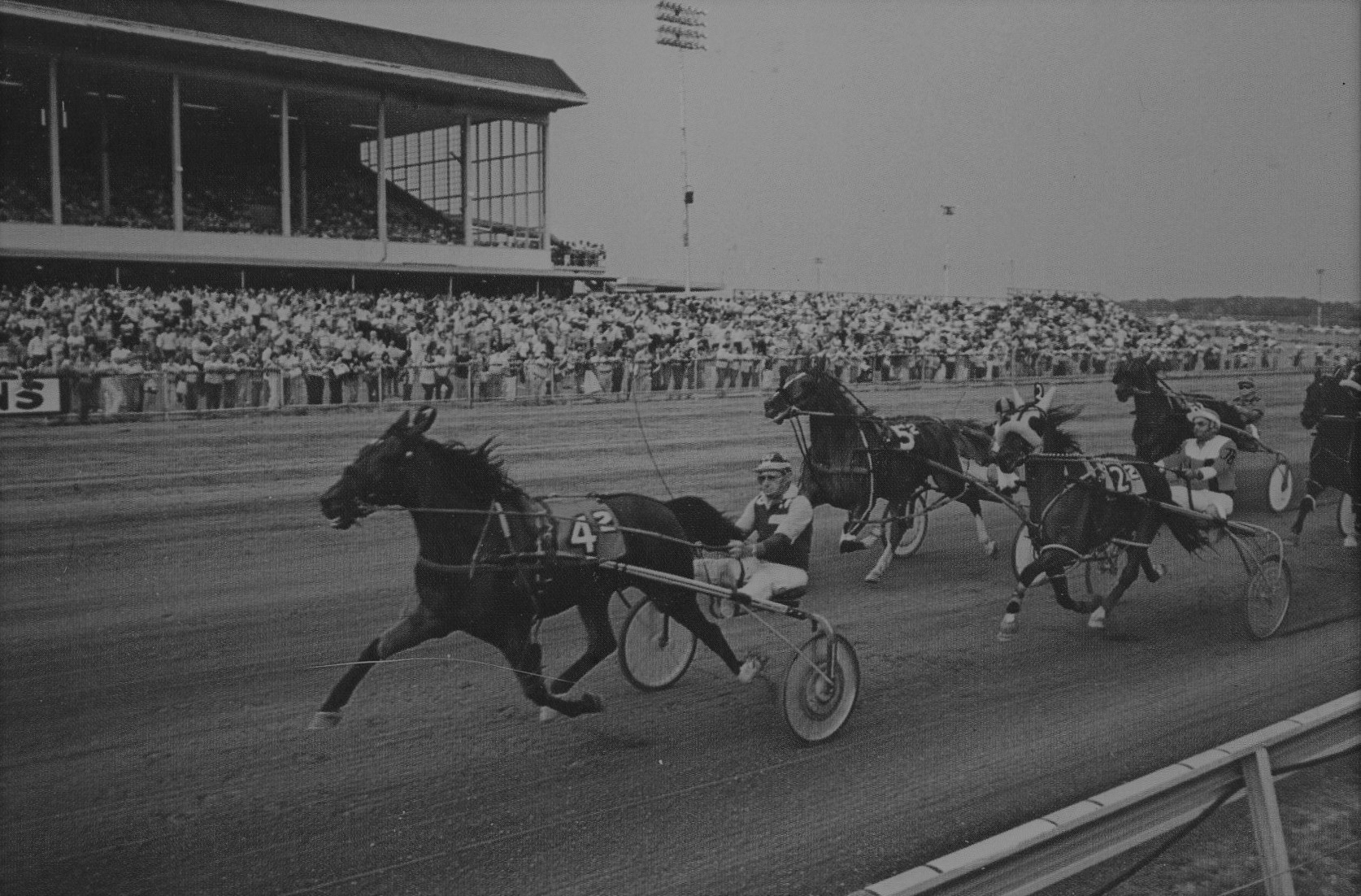
Vernon Downs Race Track

The harness racing track was opened in 1953 near Syracuse, New York, and operated successfully for many years as it quickly attained status as one of the most popular harness tracks in the country. In 1955, Adios Harry ran a "miracle mile" in 1:55, a record that stood for 18 years. As tastes changed in the late 20th century, and there was increased competition from the Meadowlands Racetrack and others who paid larger purses. At the same time, the state authorized forms of gambling to raise money. Beginning in the 1980s, Native American tribes began to establish bingo halls on their reservations and later, gaming casinos to generate revenues. By 2001, the track faced closure due to regulatory issues.

By 2001, prior to the addition of the casino, attendance declined to less than 1,000 from a peak of 4,000 plus in the 1960s and 1970s. From a one-time high of 162 race dates, Vernon Downs hosts only 70 as of the 2018 season, its 65th. Tax debts and other financial issues made it likely that the casino would shut down in 2002 despite legalization of the video slot machines which were legalized in New York following the success of Native American casinos, and as an attempt to stimulate New York's economy after September 11. After receiving a new license, Vernon Downs added simulcast harness racing, on which bets could be placed, and video gaming. This also allowed for an increase in the purse size paid to racers, although attendance was still low. Vernon Downs owner Jeff Gural cites the addition of VLTs as what saved racing. Some, like Vernon Downs, also began to host entertainment acts, particularly rock music. However, in recent years, the entertainment and promotion have dwindled to zero. The owners of the track built an associated hotel for visitors to the facility. While the horse racing season runs from April to November, the racino elements are open year-round.

=== Tax situation ===
In the 21st century, owners appealed for lower taxes in order to make their operations viable. They complain of having to compete with the Turning Stone Casino and Resort of the Oneida Indian Nation, which does not have to collect state taxes on its sovereign land. The Nation does pay a portion of its revenues to the state under a gaming compact, essentially in lieu of taxes, as well as making donations and contributions to regional communities.

On February 11, 2008, the racino/casino closed down after the New York State Assembly's Racing and Wagering Committee failed to pass a bill that would allow Vernon Downs and other racinos in New York pay less in taxes to the state. Legislation was quickly passed, and the ownership reopened the casino three days later.

In 2017, Vernon Downs faced further financial issues still due to the tax difference between the casinos on Native American lands, and the opening of three additional "Las Vegas style" casinos: Del Lago Resort & Casino near Waterloo; Rivers Casino & Resort in Schenectady; and Tioga Downs in Nichols. The start of the track season was delayed when owner Jeff Gural again cited competition from Turning Stone and Yellow Brick Road Casino in Chittenango and there were plans to close the facilities in the fall of 2017. However tax legislation that enabled a change in the fees the racino paid to the state and Tioga Downs' acquiring a full gaming license in 2016 both helped Vernon Downs as Tioga is owned by the same parent company. Despite citing plans to cut the number of slot machines by about 150, the racino still operated more than 750 as of April 2018.

== Facilities and concerts ==
The track was the site of many of the annual K-Rockathon concerts. It has hosted many large-venue acts such as Phish. It has a 173-suite hotel and fine dining restaurant. The hotel remains open at present.

=== Vernon Fairgrounds ===
In the years prior to opening as a harness racing track in 1953, the grounds served as the Vernon Fairgrounds. In the 1970s Vernon Downs returned to its roots by reinstating the Vernon “Mini-Fair,” which has since been hosted annually in different formats.

=== Stock car racing ===
A one-half mile clay oval on the premises featured the NASCAR Modified Division in 1949 and the Sportsman Division (predecessor of the Xfinity Series) in 1950 on a weekly basis. The venue also hosted two 1950 Grand National Series (now NASCAR Cup) events, which were won respectively by racing pioneers Bill Blair and Dick Linder.
