= Racing Rules of Sailing =

Rules and signals for sailing races

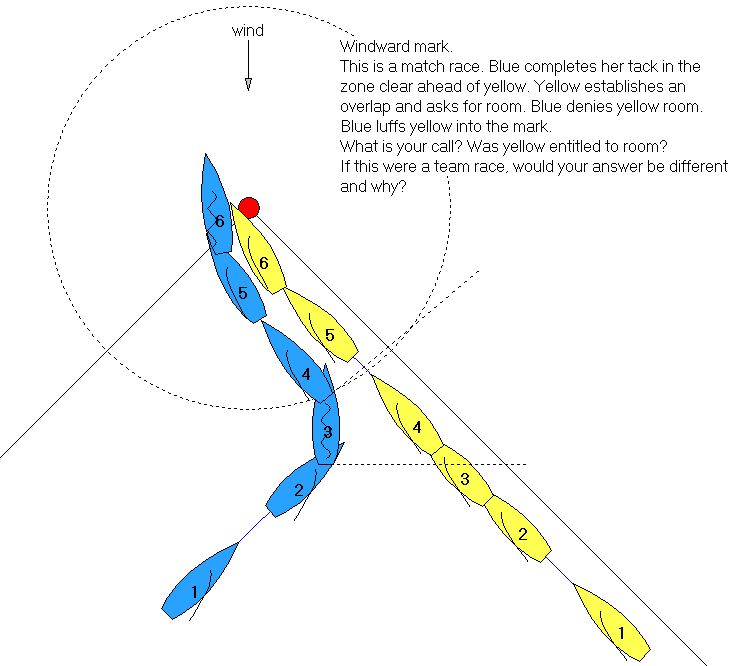
An extract from a case study in the application of Mark Room (Rule 18).

The Racing Rules of Sailing (often abbreviated to RRS) govern the conduct of yacht racing, windsurfing, kitesurfing, model boat racing, dinghy racing and virtually any other form of racing around a course with more than one vessel while powered by the wind. A new revision is published every four years (after the Olympic Games) by World Sailing, the sport's world governing body. Full information on the rules can be viewed at World Sailing.

== Contents of the rules ==
The Racing Rules of Sailing were most dramatically simplified in 1997 since the 1940s. The new document contains four main rules [Part 2, Section A]:

1. Boats on a port tack shall keep clear of boats on starboard tack (Rule 10).
2. When boats are on the same tack and overlapped, the boat to windward (the boat closest to the wind) shall keep clear of a leeward boat (Rule 11).
3. When boats are on the same tack and not overlapped, the boat that is astern shall keep clear of the boat ahead. (Rule 12).
4. When a boat is tacking (changing tack) it shall keep clear of boats that are not tacking (Rule 13).

Four rules about general limitations: [Part 2, Section B]

1. Even if you have right-of-way, it is your duty to avoid a collision, once it becomes apparent that the other boat is not keeping clear (Rule 14).
2. If you acquire right of way, you must initially give the other boat room to keep clear, unless you get right of way because of the other boat's actions. (Rule 15)
3. A boat that changes course, even if it has the right-of-way, shall do so in a manner that gives the burdened boat a chance to "keep clear" (Rule 16).
4. If you catch up with another boat and you want to pass it to leeward, you may not sail above your proper course i.e. you shall not luff higher than you would have done if that boat wasn't there (Rule 17)

Three rules about marks and obstructions [Part 2, Section C] plus some other rules about starting errors, taking penalties, moving astern, when you are capsized or anchored or run aground, and interfering with another boat.

In total there are 91 rules but (since the major simplification in 1997) only 15 rules govern what boats do when they meet on the water (part 2 rules). It is not necessary to know all of the rules to successfully compete in a dinghy race, but a knowledge of the basics is recommended.

Sailboat racing is a self-regulated sport. As stated by the Racing Rules of Sailing, "Competitors in the sport of sailing are governed by a body of rules that they are expected to follow and enforce. A fundamental principle of sportsmanship is that when competitors break a rule they will promptly take a penalty, which may be to retire.".

Depending on the nature of the infraction, the penalty may be either: (1) performing a turn consisting of one tack and one gybe or (2) performing two turns consisting of two tacks and two gybes (except for windsurfing).

For most rules infractions, a competitor may be absolved from disqualification from the race by taking such a penalty. However, if the infraction caused injury or serious damage, or produced a significant advantage in the race or series, the penalty shall be to retire. If a competitor fails to take penalty turn(s) they may be disqualified after a hearing by the Protest Committee. The aforementioned principles do not apply to match racing (like the America's Cup) where on-the-water umpires impose penalties immediately after an infraction occurs.

== Race signals ==
Sail races are governed with flags and sound signals to indicate flag changes. The flags used are taken from the International maritime signal flag set. During a race and for any signal concerning the race, these flags are defined in the Racing Rules of Sailing but the signal can be modified by the Sailing Instructions.

The raising (hoisting) or removing of a visual signal is accompanied by the emission of a sound signal to draw attention to the new signal. The type of the sound signal (one short sound, two short sounds, one long sound, etc.) is described by the rule according to the type of signal. The usual meanings of these flags are as follows:

=== Postponement signal ===
The Answering Pennant (AP) with or without a numerical pennant is used to indicate a postponed race. A numerical pennant below the AP denotes the time, in hours, of the race postponement.

Flag signal	Number of sound signals when raised	Number of sound signals when lowered	Description
AP			Races not yet started are postponed.
AP; 1			Races not yet started are postponed 1 hour.
AP; 2			Races not yet started are postponed 2 hours.
AP; 3			Races not yet started are postponed 3 hours.
AP; A			Races not yet started are postponed. No more racing today.
AP; H			Races not yet started are postponed. More information ashore.

=== Preparatory signal ===
These signal flags are used before a race start and most commonly as part of a start sequence/procedure.

Flag signal	Number of sound signals when raised	Number of sound signals when lowered	Description
P			Normal preparatory signal – no starting penalties are in effect. A boat over the line at the start can return through the line or round an end but must keep clear of boats not returning. If they fail to return through the line however they will be scored OCS (on course side).
I			The Round-an-End Rule 30.1 will be in effect. A boat over the line during the minute before the start must sail to the pre-start side of the line around either end before starting. If they fail to do this they will be scored OCS.
Z			The 20% Penalty Rule 30.2 will be in effect. A boat within the triangle formed by the ends of the line and the first mark during the minute before the start will receive a 20% scoring penalty.
I Z			Both the I flag rule and the Z flag Rule will be in effect during the minute before the start. If they fail to round an end then they will be scored OCS.
			The Black Flag Rule 30.3 will be in effect. A boat within the triangle formed by the ends of the line and the first mark during the minute before the start will be disqualified without a hearing. (Renumbered to 30.4 in the 2017–2020 edition.)
U			The U Flag Rule will be in effect. A boat within the triangle formed by the ends of the line and the first mark during the minute before the start will be disqualified without a hearing. If a restart or resail is called, the disqualification is rescinded, unlike the black-flag or Z-flag penalties. (Added to the 2017–2020 edition as rule 30.3; already frequently included in sailing instructions for specific regattas.)

=== Start signal ===
These signal flags are used in the pre-start procedure. Class flags can be numeral pennants 1 , 2 , and 3 however they can be substituted to avoid confusion with the postponement signals relating to a particular class.

Flag signal	Number of sound signals when raised	Number of sound signals when lowered	Description
1 ↑			Warning signal. 5 minutes to race start when class flag raised.
1 P ↑			Preparatory signal. 4 minutes to start when P flag raised. Flag P used or if a starting penalty applies I, Z, Black flag or I over Z is used in place of P.
1 P ↓		Long sound	Preparatory signal. P flag removed 1 minute before start. Flag P used or if a starting penalty applies I, Z, Black flag or I over Z is used in place of P.
1 ↓			Start signal. Race start when class flag removed.

=== Recall signal ===
Flag signal	Number of sound signals when raised	Number of sound signals when lowered	Description
X			Individual recall. One or more boats did not start correctly and must return and do a proper start. The X flag is displayed until the earliest of the following: all boats over the line early have returned correctly, 4 minutes from the start or until one minute before the next start. (The sound signal is in addition to the start sound signal)
1st Sub			General recall. All boats are to return and then a new start sequence will begin. Signaled when there are unidentified boats over the line or subject to one of the starting penalties, or there has been an error in the starting procedure. The new warning signal for the recalled class will be made 1 minute after the 1st substitute is removed. (The two sound signals when the first substitute is displayed are in addition to the start sound signal)

=== Course change signal ===
Flag signal	Number of sound signals when raised	Number of sound signals when lowered	Description
S			Shortened course. When displayed at a rounding mark the finish is between the nearby mark and the mast displaying the S flag. When displayed at a line that boats are required to cross at the end of each lap the finish is that line. When displayed at a gate the finish is between the gate marks.
C	...		Course change. When displayed at a rounding mark, the position of the next mark has been changed. If the direction to the mark has changed it shall be indicated by displaying the new compass bearing or a green triangular flag (or board) for a change to starboard or a red rectangular flag (or board) for a change to port. If the length of the leg has changed then this shall be signalled by displaying a "-" if the leg will shorter or a "+" if the leg will be longer. Repeated sound signals should be made to draw attention to the signal.

=== Abandonment signal ===
Flag signal	Number of sound signals when raised	Number of sound signals when lowered	Description
N			All races that have started are abandoned. Return to starting area for a new start. The first warning signal will be made 1 minute after N is removed.
N A			All races are abandoned. No more racing today.
N H			All races are abandoned. More information ashore.

=== Other signals ===
Flag signal	Number of sound signals when raised	Number of sound signals when lowered	Description
L			When displayed afloat means: Come within hail or follow this boat. When displayed ashore means: A notice to competitors has been posted.
M	...		Indicates a boat or an object displaying this signal replaces a missing mark. Repeated sound signals should be made to draw attention to the signal.
Y			All people on board should wear a personal life jacket or personal buoyancy. Indicates a protest if displayed by a competitor during match racing.
BLUE			When displayed the race committee boat is in position at the finishing line.
RED			Displayed by a competitor: Indicates a protest by this competitor in fleet racing. Indicates a request for redress in match racing.
B			Displayed by a competitor: Indicates a protest by this competitor in fleet racing. Indicates a request for redress in match racing.

== History ==
The Water Club of Cork Harbour, founded in 1720, and oldest member-led yacht club in the world, had a set of rules for members. The earliest were largely concerned with conduct and flags used to signal between yachts as the earliest club meetings sailed in formation like naval manoeuvres.

The Yacht Club, which became the Royal Yacht Squadron was similar, initially its members divided into two squadrons of equal numbers, who were supposed to sail behind the Commodore. By 1819 individual matches were being held, as sporting bets, between particular yachts.

In 1828 the Royal Yacht Squadron introduced more sailing related regulations, including forbidding the shifting of ballast, receiving outside assistance and that a yacht on the port tack should in all cases give way to one on a starboard tack.

Other yacht clubs were similarly introducing rules, the Royal Thames Yacht Club having one allowing a yacht to signal a protest by raising the club ensign. The New York Yacht Club published its rules in 1846, many of them similar to, but expanding on the RYS rules.

As yachts around Britain began to meet and race against each other the need for a common set of rules became apparent. The Royal Yachting Association was founded in 1875, and with the Prince of Wales as its Commodore, its rules were accepted by all the national clubs. The rules continued to evolve from the originals, via the Tonnage Rule and the Sail Area Rule.

Worldwide similar national yacht racing authorities were formed, each having its own, largely similar rules. The sport of sailing is sufficiently technical that which set of rules are used can make a significant difference to results, particularly in relation to measurement and definition of waterline length. Major Brooke Heckstall-Smith, secretary of the Yacht Racing Association, brought together the associations of 11 European countries in 1906 to discuss common measurement standards. The continuing discussions led to the formation of the International Yacht Racing Union (IYRU) in 1907. Renamed to International Sailing Federation (ISAF) in 1996 and World Sailing in 2015, this continues to be the rule-setting body for the sport of sailing.

== See also ==
- Dinghy racing
- International Regulations for Preventing Collisions at Sea

== Notes ==
- Anon (1907). British Yachts and Yachtsmen. The Yachtsman magazine.
