= William Robinson (trainer) =

Canadian horse trainer (1946–2020)

William Robinson (1946 – December 11, 2020) was a Canadian harness racing trainer, who won multiple Trainer of the Year awards.

== Information ==
Robinson did not come from a horse racing background. He got involved with racing after a group of friends from a local factory pitched in to claim a $1,500 horse. He later quit working at the factory to pursue horse training full-time. He ranked as one of the top conditioners in the Ontario Jockey Club in the 1980s and his success continued into the 1990s.

He faced scrutiny in 1991 for not wanting to bring his horses to the track until race day, with some suggesting it was due to unethical practices. One of his horses was suspended before 1992 for a positive Robaxin test. Accusations and suspicions arose about his success in 1993 and 1994 after the top five money winners were horses he had trained. He was investigated in 1993 and his partnership with the banned Carl Conte further fueled the suspicions. In 1993, his stable was the first in history to earn over $10 million in a single season.

In 2002, he earned more than $11 million in earnings and in 2003, his stable earned over $10.8 million. He was banned in November 2003 after an unusual drug test result on his horse, Flight Plan. He returned in 2013 but returned in 2015 when he was caught for two positive drug tests. He claimed innocence in both situations.

Robinson died on December 11, 2020, at the age of 74.

== Legacy ==
As a trainer, Robinson earned over $54.8 million. He won 2,738 races in 8,998 starts. He trained over 15 horses who had won over a million dollars each and trained three horses who had collected more than $2 million in a single year. He was also one of five trainers who earned more than $10 million at the Meadowlands Racetrack.

He trained multiple Hall of Fame horses including, Mach Three and Precious Bunny. He also trained O'Brien Award winners Riyadh, Presidential Ball, Art Major, Cams Card Shark, Dragon Again, and Nickie Bag. He later trained Western Dreamer, who was only one of ten triple crown winners.

Robinson was a four-time O'Brien Trainer of the Year Award winner in 1993, 1994, 2002, and 2003 and won the USHWA Trainer of the Year Award in 1993. Robinson's Precious Bunny and Cams Card Shark also won O'Brien Awards for Horse of the Year.

== Technique ==
Robinson trained horses at his farm in a more relaxed atmosphere. He gave them light exercise regimens' and focused on proper shoeing. He became known for turning failed horses into champions.
