= Keith Waples =

Canadian horse trainer (1923–2021)

Personal information
- Born: December 8, 1923 Victoria Harbour, Ontario, Canada
- Died: May 7, 2021 (aged 97) Guelph, Ontario, Canada
- Occupations: Harness racing driver & trainer

Horse racing career
- Sport: Horse racing
- Career wins: 3,207 (many more from earlier times when records were not kept)

Major racing wins
- Maple Leaf Trot (1954, 1962); International Trot (1962); Little Brown Jug (1972); Messenger Stakes (1972); Adios Pace (1972); Prix d'Été (1972)

Honours
- Canada's Sports Hall of Fame (1973); Canadian Horse Racing Hall of Fame (1978); United States Harness Racing Hall of Fame (1987)

Significant horses
- Tie Silk, Strike Out
- Updated on October 13, 2016

Keith Gordon Waples (December 8, 1923 – May 7, 2021) was a Canadian Hall of Fame sulky driver and horse trainer in the sport of harness racing. In 1959, Waples became the first driver to record a sub two-minute mile in Canada and the first to win a $100,000 race in Canada.

In 1962, Keith Waples drove Tie Silk to victory in the International Trot at Roosevelt Raceway and in 1972 with the colt Strike Out he won the Little Brown Jug, the Adios Pace and Prix d'Été.

Keith Waples was inducted into Canada's Sports Hall of Fame in 1973 and the Canadian Horse Racing Hall of Fame in 1978 and the United States Harness Racing Hall of Fame in 1987. In 2008, Waples was an inductee (Athlete category) of the Midland (Ontario) Sports Hall of Fame. Waples died in May 2021, at the age of 97.
