= Armbro Nesbit =

Canadian Standardbred racehorse

Armbro Nesbit (1970–1977) was a champion Standardbred pacing horse, raised in Ontario, Canada. He raced for three years, earning $625,964 and retired with 35 wins, 12 seconds and 11 thirds in 76 starts.

Armbro Nesbit was inducted into the Canadian Horse Racing Hall of Fame in 1977.

== See also ==
- Harness racing
