= Little Brown Jug (horse race) =

Harness stakes race for 3-year-old pacers

Coordinates: 40°19′01″N 83°04′29″W

- Class: Pacing Triple Crown
- Location: Delaware County Fairgrounds racetrack Delaware, Ohio
- Inaugurated: 1946 (80 years ago)
- Race type: Standardbred
- Website: www.littlebrownjug.com

Race information
- Distance: 1 mile (8.0 furlongs)
- Surface: Dirt
- Track: Left-handed
- Qualification: 3-year-olds

The Little Brown Jug is a harness race for three-year-old pacing standardbred horses hosted by the Delaware County Agricultural Society since 1946 at the Delaware County Fairgrounds racetrack in Delaware, Ohio. The race takes place every year on the third Thursday after Labor Day.

Along with the Hambletonian, a race for trotters, it is one of the two most coveted races for standardbreds. The event is named after Little Brown Jug, a pacer, who won nine consecutive races and became a USTA Hall of Fame Immortal in 1975.

The race is the counterpart to the Jugette for three-year-old fillies.

== History ==
It began in 1937 when the Delaware County Agricultural Society's members, at their annual meeting, voted to move the County Fair, held since its inception at Powell, to Delaware on a tract of land at the northern edge of the city. Two years later a half-mile track was built and provided the stage for harness racing. R.K. McNamara, a local contractor, designed and built the lightning fast track. Enter attorney Joe Neville, whose family had been identified with the standardbred sport for many years, and his friend, Henry C. "Hank" Thomson, sports editor of The Delaware Gazette. Neville, who had campaigned horses on the Grand Circuit and was familiar with its officers and stewards, was successful in obtaining Grand Circuit dates for the new Delaware track. Neville, concerned over the years by the emphasis placed on the trotter, turned his efforts toward showcasing the pacers, particularly the 3-year-olds. The Little Brown Jug Society was formed to stage the Grand Circuit meeting. Neville headed the organization with Thomson as secretary-treasurer. Then came the birth of the Little Brown Jug, named through a newspaper contest won by Major Lanning Parsons, with its previews in 1944 and 1945. The initial Jug in 1946, with a purse of $35,358, was won by Ensign Hanover with Delaware's T. Wayne "Curly" Smart driving. Smart, a successful trainer-driver on the Grand Circuit, was later to become an integral part of the Jug's operation as the track superintendent. Over the years the track monopolized the half-mile record section with world standard performances, mainly through Smart's skill in maintaining the fastest racing strip of its size in the country.

In 1956, the Little Brown Jug joined the Cane Pace and Messenger Stakes as the three races comprising the newly designated Triple Crown of Pacing.[2]

In 2023, the total purse of the race (including the purses of the heats) was increased to $1,000,000 for the first time.

=== Race Structure ===
The Little Brown Jug is contested in heats. Up until 2016, a horse had to win 2 heats in order to be crowned the winner of the Little Brown Jug. The first heat is split into several divisions, with the top finishers in each division returning to contest the second heat. A horse wins the Little Brown Jug by winning both heats. If a horse does not win both heats, a race off is conducted between the first heat division winners, and the winner of the second heat, to determine the champion. Starting in 2017, the first heat is still split into several divisions (usually 2, sometimes 3) and the top finishers in each division still return to the second heat - however the winner of the second heat is now considered the winner of the Little Brown Jug regardless of if the horse won a division in the first heat.

Ever since 1946 the administrators of the Little Brown Jug have glazed the winners of the horse race on a jug. In 2005, they ran out of room on the first jug and had to make another one. This time, instead of making it out of clay, they made it out of plastic so it would be lighter.

== Records ==
Most wins by a driver

- 5 – Billy Haughton (1955, 1964, 1968, 1969, 1974)
- 5 – Michel Lachance (1988, 1989, 1994, 1997, 2001)
- 5 – David Miller (2003, 2008, 2011, 2016, 2018)

Most wins by a trainer

- 6 – Billy Haughton (1955, 1964, 1968, 1969, 1974, 1985)

Stakes record

- 1:49 0/0 – Betting Line (2016), It's My Show (2023)

== Little Brown Jug winners ==
Year	Winner	Driver	Trainer	Owner	Time	Purse
2025	Louprint	Ronnie Wrenn Jr.	Ron Burke	Burke Racing Stable, Weaver Bruscemi, Phil Collura, Lawrence Karr	1:50 1/5	$500,000
2024	Captain Albano	Todd McCarthy	Noel Daley	Patricia Stable, LA Express Stable, Sjoblom Racing Inc., Michael Dolan	1:50 1/5	$525,000
2023	It's My Show	Scott Zeron	Linda Toscano	Richard Young, Joanne Young	1:49 0/0	$850,000
2022	Bythemissal	Chris Page	Ron Burke	Burke Racing Stable, Eric Good, Rich Lombardo Racing, Weaver Bruscemi	1:51 1/5	$541,550
2021	Lou's Pearlman	Yannick Gingras	Ron Burke	Burke Racing Stable, Weaver Bruscemi, Elizabeth Novak, Howard Taylor	1:52 4/5	$661,800
2020	Captain Barbossa	Joe Bongiorno	Tony Alagna	Alagnafrankinthegym Stable, Robert Leblanc, and David Anderson	1:49 1/5	$559,000
2019	Southwind Ozzi	Brian Sears	Bill MacKenzie	Vincent Ali Jr., Alma Iafelice	1:50 1/5	$642,000
2018	Courtly Choice	David Miller	Blake Macintosh	Hutt Racing Stable, Mac & Heims Stables, Daniel Plouffe, Touch Stone Farms	1:49 4/5	$642,000
2017	Filibuster Hanover	Yannick Gingras	Ron Burke	Burke Racing Stable, Joseph DiScala Jr, J & T Silva Stables, Weaver Bruscemi	1:50 0/0	$590,000
2016	Betting Line	David Miller	Casie Coleman	West Wins Stable, Christine Calhoun, Mac T. Nichol	1:49 0/5	$577,000
2015	Wiggle It Jiggleit	Montrell Teague	Clyde Francis	George Teague Jr. Inc.	1:49 3/5	$677,000
2014	Limelight Beach	Yannick Gingras	Ron Burke	Burke Racing Stable, Weaver Bruscemi, M1 Stable, Wingfield Bros	1:50 4/5	$647,500
2013	Vegas Vacation	Brian Sears	Casie Coleman	West Wins Stable, Adriano Sorella, Anthony Beaton, Phyllis Saunders	1:50 0/0	$552,551
2012	Michael's Power	Scott Zeron	Casie Coleman	Jeffrey S. Snyder	1:50 0/0	$487,550
2011	Big Bad John	David Miller	Ron Potter	Winchester Baye Acres	1:50 0/0	$526,800
2010	Rock N Roll Heaven	Daniel Dubé	Bruce Saunders	Frank J. Bellino	1:49 2/5	$604,100
2009	Well Said	Ronald Pierce	Steve Elliott	Jeffrey S. Snyder, Lothlorien	1:51 4/5	$609,150
2008	Shadow Play	David Miller	Ian Moore	Ian Moore, Serge Savard, R G McGroup	1:50 1/5	$555,000
2007	Tell All	Jody Jamieson	Blair Burgess	My Desire Stable	1:52 0/5	$480,000
2006	Mr Feelgood	Mark J. MacDonald	Jimmy Takter	Canamerica Cptl, Diversity Stable, Lindy Farm	1:50 3/5	$541,000
2005	P-Forty Seven	Dave Palone	Kelly O'Donnell	M. Maynard, K. O'Donnell & C. Ed Mullinax	1:52 1/5	$569,032
2004	Timesareachanging	Ronald Pierce	Brett Pelling	Perfect World Enterprises	1:51 3/5	$571,500
2003	No Pan Intended	David Miller	Ivan Sugg	Peter Pan Stables Inc.	1:53 0/5	$605,050
2002	Million Dollar Cam	Luc Ouellette	William Robinson	Jeffrey S. Snyder	1:50 2/5	$618,625
2001	Bettor's Delight	Michel Lachance	Scott McEneny	John B. Grant	1:51 4/5	$646,050
2000	Astreos	Charalambos Christoforou	Brett Pelling	Makis Chrysomilas, Charalambos Christoforou, Banjo Farms	1:55 3/5	$547,972
1999	Blissful Hall	Ronald Pierce	Benjamin Wallace	Daniel Plouffe	1:55 3/5	$543,980
1998	Shady Character	Ronald Pierce	Brett Pelling	Sanford and Corinne Goldfarb	1:52 3/5	$566,630
1997	Western Dreamer	Michel Lachance	William Robinson	Matthew J., Patrick J. Jr., and Daniel J. Daly	1:51 1/5	$605,210
1996	Armbro Operative	Jack Moiseyev	Brendan Johnson	Thomas Walsh, Jr., David McDuffee	1:52 3/5	$542,240
1995	Nick's Fantasy	John Campbell	Caroline Lyon	Markenjay Stud	1:51 2/5	$543,670
1994	Magical Mike	Michel Lachance	Thomas Haughton	Shadow Lane Farm, David McDuffee	1:52 3/5	$512,830
1993	Life Sign	John Campbell	Gene Riegle	Brittany Farms	1:52 0/5	$465,500
1992	Fake Left	Ron Waples	George Sholty	Status Stables Inc.	1:54 4/5	$556,210
1991	Precious Bunny	Jack Moiseyev	William Robinson	R. Peter Heffering	1:55 0/5	$575,150
1990	Beach Towel	Ray Remmen	Larry Remmen	Uptown Stable	1:53 3/5	$468,050
1989	Goalie Jeff	Michel Lachance	Thomas Artandi	Centre Ice Stable	1:54 1/5	$500,200
1988	B. J. Scoot	Michel Lachance	Thomas Artandi	Sybarite Stable	1:52 3/5	$486,050
1987	Jaguar Spur	Richard Stillings	Charles "Buddy" Stillings	Roy D. Davis, Barberry Farms	1:55 3/5	$412,330
1986	Barberry Spur	Bill O'Donnell	Richard Stillings	Roy D. Davis, Barberry Farms	1:52 4/5	$407,684
1985	Nihilator	Bill O'Donnell	Billy Haughton	Wall Street Stable, Nihilator Syndicate	1:52 1/5	$350,730
1984	Colt Fortysix	Chris Boring	Chris Boring	Proudfoot Farms	1:55 2/5	$366,717
1983	Ralph Hanover	Ron Waples	Stewart Firlotte	Ron Waples, Pointsetta Stables, Grants Direct Stables, P. J. Baugh	1:55 3/5	$358,800
1982	Merger	John Campbell	John Campbell	J. Campbell, D. Morrisey, P. Oud, W. Muldering	1:56 3/5	$328,900
1981	Fan Hanover	Glen Garnsey	William Smythe	J. Glen Brown	1:58 4/5	$243,779
1980	Niatross	Clint Galbraith	Clint Galbraith	Clint Galbraith, Elsie Berger, Niatross Stable	1:54 4/5	$207,361
1979	Hot Hitter	Hervé Filion	Louis Meittinis	Solomon Katz, S A J Ranch Ltd., Alterman Stables	1:55 3/5	$226,455
1978	Happy Escort	William Popfinger	William Popfinger	Keystone Arbor Stable	2:00 4/5	$186,760
1977	Governor Skipper	John Chapman	Howard "Buck" Norris	Ivanhoe Stable	1:56 2/5	$150,000
1976	Keystone Ore	Stanley Dancer	Stanley Dancer	F&F Perry, R. Jones, S.F. Dancer, R.L. Dancer & R. Hild	1:57 2/5	$153,799
1975	Seatrain	Benny Webster	Lee Benson	Lee Benson	1:59 4/5	$147,813
1974	Armbro Omaha	Billy Haughton	Billy Haughton	J. Elgin Armstrong	1:58 4/5	$132,630
1973	Melvin's Woe	Joe O'Brien	Joe O'Brien	Thurman Downing	1:59 2/5	$120,000
1972	Strike Out	Keith Waples	John Hayes	Beejay Stable	1:56 3/5	$104,916
1971	Nansemond	Hervé Filion	Charles O. Mumford	F. Perry, W. Camp, Jr., Capital Hill Farms	1:57 2/5	$102,964
1970	Most Happy Fella	Stanley Dancer	Stanley Dancer	Egyptian Acres Stable	1:57 3/5	$100,110
1969	Laverne Hanover	Billy Haughton	Billy Haughton	Thomas W. Murphy, Jr.	2:00 2/5	$109,731
1968	Rum Customer	Billy Haughton	Billy Haughton	Louis & Connie Manucuso & Kennilworth Farm	1:59 3/5	$104,226
1967	Best Of All	James Hackett	James Hackett	Samuel Huttenbauer	2:00 0/5	$84,778
1966	Romeo Hanover	George Sholty	Jerry Silverman	Lucky Star Stables & Morton Finder	1:59 3/5	$74,616
1965	Bret Hanover	Frank Ervin	Frank Ervin	Richard Downing	1:57 0/5	$71,447
1964	Vicar Hanover	Billy Haughton	Billy Haughton	Donald D. MacFarlane	2:01 0/5	$66,590
1963	Overtrick	John F. Patterson, Sr.	John F. Patterson, Sr.	Allwood Stable (Leonard J. & Helen R. Buck)	1:57 3/5	$68,294
1962	Lehigh Hanover	Stanley Dancer	Stanley Dancer	Lehigh Stables	1:59 3/5	$75,039
1961	Henry T. Adios	Stanley Dancer	Stanley Dancer	Dr. & Mrs. Nicholas Derrico	2:05 0/5	$70,069
1960	Bullet Hanover	John F. Simpson Sr.	John F. Simpson, Sr.	T. W. Murphy, Jr., J. F. Simpson, Hanover Shoe Farm	1:59 3/5	$66,510
1959	Adios Butler	Clint Hodgins	Paige H. West	Paige H. West & Angelo Pellillo	2:00 4/5	$76,582
1958	Shadow Wave	Joe O'Brien	Joe O'Brien	S. A. Camp Farms	2:01 0/5	$65,252
1957	Torpid	John F. Simpson, Sr.	John F. Simpson, Sr.	Sherwood Farm	2:03 4/5	$73,528
1956	Noble Adios	John F. Simpson, Sr.	John F. Simpson, Sr.	Paul Wixom	2:00 4/5	$52,666
1955	Quick Chief	Billy Haughton	Billy Haughton	Farmsted Acres & John Froelich	2:00 2/5	$66,608
1954	Adios Harry	Morris MacDonald	Morris MacDonald	J. Howard Lyons	2:03 2/5	$69,322
1953	Keystoner	Frank Ervin	Frank Ervin	George H. Tipling	2:09 3/5	$54,972
1952	Meadow Rice	T. Wayne Smart	Delvin Miller	William G. Reynolds	2:02 3/5	$60,463
1951	Tar Heel	Del Cameron	Delvin Miller	William N. Reynolds Estate	2:00 0/5	$66,280
1950	Dudley Hanover	Delvin Miller	Delvin Miller	Hayes Fair Acres	2:03 2/5	$56,525
1949	Good Time	Frank Ervin	Frank Ervin	William H. Cane	2:03 2/5	$58,281
1948	Knight Dream	Franklin E. Safford	Franklin E. Safford	Armstrong Bros & Gray Bros	2:07 1/5	$47,528
1947	Forbes Chief	Del Cameron	Del Cameron	Newport Stock Farm	2:05 0/5	$38,200
1946	Ensign Hanover	T. Wayne Smart	Sep Palin	Castleton Farm	2:07 1/5	$35,358
