= Bret Hanover =

American Standardbred racehorse

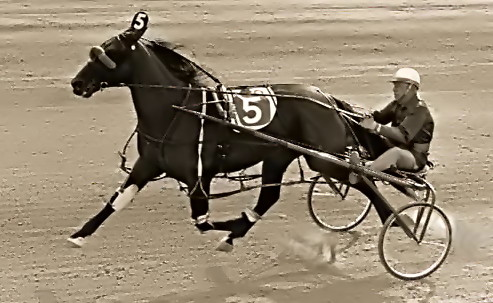
- Breed: Standardbred
- Sire: Adios
- Grandsire: Hal Dale
- Dam: Brenna Hanover
- Damsire: Tar Heel
- Sex: Stallion
- Foaled: May 19, 1962
- Died: November 21, 1992
- Country: United States
- Colour: Bay
- Breeder: Hanover Shoe Farms
- Owner: Richard Downing
- Trainer: Frank Ervin
- Record: 68: 62-5-1
- Earnings: $922,616
- Gait: Pace
- Driver: Frank Ervin
- Mile record: 1:53.3 (T)
- Groom: Dave Willoughby

Major wins
- Lawrence B. Sheppard Pace (1964); Roosevelt Futurity (1964); Cane Pace (1965); Little Brown Jug (1965); Messenger Stakes (1965); Realization Pace (1966); Empire Pace (1966); Prix d'Automne (1966)

Awards
- United States Harness Horse of the Year (1964, 1965, 1966); Triple Crown of Harness Racing for Pacers (1966); World Pacers Mile Record (twice)

Honors
- United States Harness Racing Hall of Fame (1994)

Bret Hanover (May 19, 1962 – November 21, 1992) was an outstanding American Standardbred racehorse. He was one of only ten pacers to win harness racing's Triple Crown of Harness Racing for Pacers and won 62 of 68 starts. He was the first horse to be voted United States Harness Horse of the Year three times and remains the only pacer to have received that honor.

== Breeding ==
He was foaled at Hanover Shoe Farms in Hanover, Pennsylvania, on May 19, 1962. Bret Hanover was by the leading sire Adios and out of Brenna Hanover by Tar Heel, a Little Brown Jug winner and a leading sire. At the yearling sales of 1963 Bret Hanover sold for $50,000 the highest priced yearling that year.

== 1964 season ==
Trained and driven by Frank Ervin in his 1964 debut season in racing, Bret won all 24 of his starts, including the Fox Stake, Battle of Saratoga, Goshen Cup, Review-Little Pat Stake, American National, McMahon Memorial, Roosevelt Futurity, Ohio Standardbred Futurity, Meadow Lands Farm Stake, Star Pointer Stake and Lawrence Sheppard Pace. He earned $173,298 and was named USTA Horse of the Year, the first two-year-old ever to have been given that honour.

== 1965 season ==
As a 3yo in 1965, Bret Hanover won the Cane Pace, Commodore Pace, Matron Pace, Hanover-Hempt Stake, Battle of Saratoga, Reynolds Memorial, and Arden Downs Pace remaining unbeaten. The Arden Downs was his 35th consecutive win. His next start was at Springfield at the Illinois State Fair track in the Review Futurity, where he suffered defeat for the first time — in the first heat, he was beaten into second place by Adios Vic. However, he won the second heat in a faster time, claiming the stakes. In the Horseman Futurity at Indianapolis, Bret Hanover won the first heat in 1:55.0 to equal the fastest race mile in history, but he was again beaten by Adios Vic in the second heat (1:56.3), forcing a race-off, which was won by Adios Vic. In September, Bret Hanover won the Little Brown Jug, setting a world record in the first heat despite rain delaying the start of the race. His time for the two heats was 1:57 and 1:57 2/5, which was also a two-heat world record for a race on a half-mile track. He beat Tuxedo Hanover by 3 1/4 lengths in the first heat and 2 lengths in the second before a record crowd of 41,200. Adios Vic, the only horse to have beaten Bret Hanover, was fourth in both heats. Bret Hanover then won the Messenger Stakes at Roosevelt Raceway to claim the Pacers Triple Crown. He won 21 of 24 starts as a 3yo, earned $340,975 and took U.S. Horse of The Year honors again.

== 1966 season ==
In his last year of racing, as a four-year-old, Bret Hanover made 20 starts for 17 wins. He lowered the world record to 1:54 and then to 1:53 3/5 at The Red Mile. He was defeated by Cardigan Bay in the Pace of the Century at Yonkers Raceway but beat him in the Revenge Pace. He also won his next four races against Cardigan Bay. During 1966, Bret Hanover won several major races, including the American National, Empire Pace and Realization Pace. He also made a start in Canada winning the Autumn Classic before a record Canadian crowd for a harness race of 24,454. In his last ever race, the American Classic at Hollywood Park, Bret Hanover set a torrid pace reaching the half mile in 56 seconds and the mile in 1:54 3/5 before tiring. True Duane won with Cardigan Bay finishing second and Bret Hanover third. Trainer and driver Frank Ervin, who was unwell, later admitted he would not have driven Bret Hanover had it not been his last race. Bret Hanover was then retired with a record of 68 starts for 62 wins, 5 seconds and 1 third, and $922,616 in stakes earnings. He was named U. S. Horse of the Year again for 1966.

Bret Hanover is one of only nine horses in history to win the Triple Crown of Harness Racing for Pacers. He retired as the fastest and richest Standardbred pacer.

== Stud record ==
Bret Hanover sold to Castleton Farm in Lexington, Kentucky, for a record $1 million. He sired the winners of $64,380,702, including Little Brown Jug winners Melvin's Woe and Strike Out. He is remembered as one of the best broodmare sires.

After his death on November 21, 1992, Bret Hanover was buried at Castleton before his grave was moved to Lexington's Kentucky Horse Park. The bronze sculpture by Spanish sculptor Luis Sanguino that had been erected for him at Castleton Farm today stands at his gravesite.

In 1994 he was inducted into the United States Harness Racing Hall of Fame.

Numerous stories have been written about the horse, including the book "Big Bum, The Story of Bret Hanover". Bret Hanover bowed to the crowd after every win, his driver Frank Ervin got out of the sulky, and Bret then crossed his front legs and bent over as the crowd responded.

== Sire line tree ==
- Bret Hanover
  - Strike Out
    - Hot Hitter
  - Warm Breeze
    - Falcon Seelster
      - Shady Character

== See also ==
- List of racehorses

== See also ==
For links to other harness horse information and biographies, see also:

- Harness racing in the United States
- Cardigan Bay (NZ)
