= Adios Harry =

Standardbred racehorse

Adios Harry (1951–1982) was a racehorse born to Adios and Helen Win. In 1955, Harry, driven by Luther Lyons, ran a "miracle mile" in 1:55, a record that stood for 18 years and was considered one of the greatest performances by any harness horse. In total he shattered the mile standard five times at New York's Vernon Downs. By the time he was five, Harry held twelve world pacing records. He was featured on the front cover of the July 23, 1956, issue of Sports Illustrated magazine, under the banner, "ADIOS HARRY: World's Fastest Pacer." The magazine dubbed him "Harry the Horrid".

In 2002 he was inducted into the Harness Racing Museum.
