= Hervé Filion =

Canadian horse racer (1940–2017)

Personal information
- Born: February 1, 1940 Angers, Quebec, Canada
- Died: June 22, 2017 (aged 77) Mineola, New York, U.S.
- Occupations: Harness racing driver, trainer, owner

Horse racing career
- Sport: Horse racing
- Career wins: 15,180

Major racing wins
- Dexter Cup (1970); Hudson Filly Trot (1971, 1977, 1991, 1994); Lawrence B. Sheppard Pace (1973, 1974, 1978, 1981); Adios Pace (1979), Prix d'Été (1979); Maple Leaf Trot (1986); Lady Suffolk Filly Trot (1990) Breeders Crown wins: Breeders Crown 2YO Filly Pace (1985); Breeders Crown Open Mare Trot (1986) U.S. Pacing Triple Crown wins: Little Brown Jug (1971, 1979); Cane Futurity (1978)

Racing awards
- Harness Tracks of America Driver of the Year (1969-1974, 1976, 1978, 1981, 1989); Harness Racing World Driving Championship (1970)

Honours
- Canada's Sports Hall of Fame (1969); Order of Canada (1971); Lou Marsh Trophy (1971); Canadian Horse Racing Hall of Fame (1976); United States Harness Racing Hall of Fame (1976)

Significant horses
- Hot Hitter, Nansemond, Nero
- Updated on November 17, 2016

Hervé Arthur Filion, OC (February 1, 1940 – June 22, 2017) was a Canadian harness racing driver. He was the brother of Yves Filion who drove and trained the 1988 North America Cup winner; and the brother of Henri Filion (1941–1997) who died from his injuries following a racing accident at Hippodrome Aylmer, Quebec; and the uncle of Sylvain Filion who won the 1999 Harness Racing World Driving Championship .

Born in Angers, Quebec, in 1940 Filion became the first driver to win over 400 races in a year and was able to achieve this accomplishment 14 more times. Filion is second all-time in career wins in North America, with 15,180. He was voted the Harness Tracks of America Driver of the Year a record ten times.

In 2000, Filion pleaded guilty to charges that he failed to file New York State Income Tax Returns, ending a five-year investigation into race-fixing.

Filion officially retired in October 2012, his final win at Rideau Carleton Raceway in Ottawa, Ontario.

In 1971, he was made an Officer of the Order of Canada and was awarded the Lou Marsh Trophy. In 1976, he was inducted into the Canadian Horse Racing Hall of Fame and the United States Harness Racing Hall of Fame.

Filion died on June 22, 2017, from complications of chronic obstructive pulmonary disease (COPD).
