= Tar Heel (horse) =

American Standardbred racehorse

Tar Heel (April 25, 1948 - June 8, 1982) was an American Harness Racing Hall of Fame Standardbred racehorse. Given the State of North Carolina nickname "Tar Heel", he was bred by William Reynolds at his Tanglewood Farm near Winston-Salem, North Carolina.

== Racing career ==
Tar Heel was race conditioned for Reynolds by legendary trainer Delvin Miller and driven by 1974 Hall of Fame inductee, Del Cameron. At two, among Tar Heel's wins were the Review Stakes, Two Gaits Farm Pace, Geers 2YO Colt Stakes and American National 2YO Colt Pace. He recorded the fastest time for a two-year-old pacer over one mile with a 2:00 3/5 clocking in a time trial.

At three in 1951, his biggest win came in the most prestigious race in American harness racing for pacers, the Little Brown Jug. In addition, Tar Heel won the Geers 3YO Colt Stakes and the American National 3YO Colt Pace. For the second straight year Tar Heel recorded the fastest time for pacers at his age over one mile, clocking of 1:57 2/5 in a time trial.

== At stud ==
Following the death of owner William Reynolds in September 1951, Tar Heel was sold at auction to Lawrence B. Sheppard for $125,000, the then highest price for any Standardbred in history. When retired to stud, Tar Heel stood at Hanover Shoe Farms in Pennsylvania where he was a highly successful stallion. The sire of Little Brown Jug winners Laverne Hanover and Nansemond, Tar Heel was also an outstanding broodmare sire. His daughters most notably produced Romeo Hanover and Ralph Hanover, both winners of the United States Triple Crown for Pacers, as well as Bret Hanover, regarded as one of the greatest pacers in harness racing history.

== Death and Longevity ==
Tar Heel died in his sleep after a brief age-related illness at the age of 34, which was during a time that the average lifespan for standardbred horses was 24 to 27 years. His son Waco Hanover (May 4, 1977 - February 9, 2019) became the longest lived standardbred on record and likely the longest lived of any racehorse, having lived 41 years and 281 days. Waco, as he was often called, had his story produced on CBS Sunday Morning at the beginning of 2017, and lived out his final days in Vermont as a companion horse with his caretaker and other younger horses. On June 17, 2018, Waco surpassed the previous longest lived record of 41 years and 45 days held by the standardbred New Zealand pacer stallion named Lighterman Tom (August 23, 1946 - October 5, 1987), who only won one race in his career, but produced a New Zealand Cup winner named Lightning Blue and lived 43 days past his 41st birthday.
