= Hal Dale =

American Standardbred pacing stallion (1926–1955)

- Breed: Standardbred
- Sire: Abbedale
- Grandsire: The Abbe
- Dam: Margaret Hal
- Damsire: Argot Hal
- Sex: Stallion
- Foaled: 1926
- Country: United States
- Breeder: William A. Thompson
- Owner: Abe A. McClamrock; Leo C. McNamara
- Record: p,6,2:02¼
- Earnings: $595

Honours
- United States Harness Racing Hall of Fame (1956)

Hal Dale (1926 – October 16, 1955) was an American Standardbred pacing stallion who established a prominent pacing line through sons including Adios, Good Time, and Dale Frost. He was elected an Immortal of the United States Harness Racing Hall of Fame in 1956.

== Background ==
Hal Dale was bred by William A. Thompson and foaled in 1926 at Thompson's Ben Hur Farm in New Ross, Indiana, United States. He was from the first crop of Abbedale out of Margaret Hal, by Argot Hal.

In 1927, Hal Dale and his dam were sold to Abe A. McClamrock of Frankfort, Indiana.

== Racing career ==
=== Six-year-old season ===
Hal Dale did not make his racing debut until 1932, at the age of six. He won races at Goshen, Indiana, and LaPorte, Indiana, while racing as a pacer. Tendon problems brought his racing career to an end. He retired with earnings of $595 and a lifetime pacing mark of 2:02¼.

He was consigned to the Indianapolis Speed Sale in November 1936 as part of a dispersal of McClamrock's horses. Hal Dale was purchased by Leo C. McNamara for $2,000.

== Stud record ==
He was placed at stud at McNamara's Two Gaits Farm in Carmel, Indiana. Hal Dale initially attracted limited interest from breeders after arriving at Two Gaits Farm. At the time, his most prominent offspring included Frisco Dale, who held a two-year-old record of 2:04½ and had finished second in the Fox Stake. His reputation as a sire developed largely through horses bred from mares at Two Gaits.

In 1938, he produced at least 13 new record performers, with another five of his offspring lowering their previous marks. Among his notable offspring were Adios, Good Time, Keystoner, Walter McKylo, and Dale Frost. As his offspring began to establish themselves, Hal Dale became the foundation of an influential pacing sire line. Adios became one of the leading pacing sires of the mid-20th century, while Dale Frost later sired Meadow Skipper, another influential Standardbred stallion. Good Time also developed into an important sire, with descendants including Race Time, Best of All, and Laughing Girl, the dam of Most Happy Fella. His daughters were also being retained as broodmares by leading Standardbred nurseries.

Hal Dale remained active at stud until his death, with another crop of foals expected from mares bred to him during the final year of his life. By the end of his stud career, Hal Dale had sired ten pacers with records of 2:00 or faster. Standardbred Canada credits him with 377 offspring, including seven that earned at least $100,000 and two that earned at least $250,000.

== Death ==
Hal Dale died on October 16, 1955, at Two Gaits Farm in Carmel, Indiana, United States, at the age of 29.

== Legacy ==
Hal Dale was elected to the Hall of Immortals of the United States Harness Racing Hall of Fame in 1956.

Standardbred Canada later included Hal Dale among the sires whose family names are reserved by the organization.

== Pedigree ==
Hal Dale was a son of Abbedale, a Grand Circuit pacer who later became a leading sire. Abbedale was by The Abbe, whose descendants became one of the principal male lines in American pacing. His pedigree was regarded as an outcross to many of the prevailing Standardbred bloodlines of the period, which were heavily influenced by Axworthy, Peter the Great, Grattan, and Direct Blood.
