= Stanley Dancer =

American harness racing driver and trainer (1927–2005)

Personal information
- Born: July 25, 1927 West Windsor Township, New Jersey, USA
- Died: September 8, 2005 (aged 78) Pompano Beach, Florida, USA
- Occupations: Harness racing : driver / trainer / owner

Horse racing career
- Sport: Horse racing
- Career wins: 3,781

Major racing wins
- International Trot (1961, 1963)

Honours
- United States Harness Racing Hall of Fame (1969); Little Brown Jug Wall of Fame (1989)

Significant horses
- Albatross, Cardigan Bay, Keystone Ore, Most Happy Fella, Nevele Pride, Silent Majority, Su Mac Lad, Super Bowl
- Updated on January 10, 2017

Stanley Franklin Dancer (July 25, 1927 – September 8, 2005) was an American harness racing driver and trainer. He was the only horseman to drive and train three Triple Crowns in horse racing. In total, he drove 23 Triple Crown winners. He was the first trainer to campaign a horse to $1 million in a career, Cardigan Bay in 1968, and drove the Harness Horse of the Year seven times. During his career, he won over $28 million and 3,781 races and was called by the United States Trotting Association "perhaps the best-known personality in the sport".

Dancer was born in West Windsor Township, New Jersey on July 25, 1927, and grew up on a farm in the New Egypt section of Plumsted Township, New Jersey, living in the area for almost his entire life on a 160-acre (0.65 km^{2}) farm with a half-mile training track before moving to Pompano Beach, Florida, in 1999. He dropped out of school after eighth grade.

He borrowed silks for his first race, driving a horse he had bought for $75 using money he had won from a 4-H Club. He started driving horses at Freehold Raceway in 1945, winning his first race the following year. Dancer started his stable in 1948 with a trotter he had bought using $250 of his wife's college savings. That horse, Candor, took home $12,000 during the following three years.

A spindly 5 feet 8 inches (1.73 m), and weighing in at 135 pounds (61 kg), Red Smith described him as not looking "old enough to be let out for night racing." Despite his size, he used an aggressive, all-out style right from the start, and retained his aggressive methods despite 32 racing spills — including a 1955 incident in which he broke his back — four car accidents, and crashes in both an airplane and a helicopter, as well as two heart attacks during his driving career. He had been given a physician's guidance to quit racing, but declined to take the advice, noting that "There is nothing dangerous about harness racing. The worst crackup I ever had came in an auto accident."

In a six-horse field at the 1961 International Trot at Roosevelt Raceway, Dancer drove Su Mac Lad, finishing in a time of 2:34.4 in driving rain and a sloppy track in front of 28,105 racing fans, with the French horse Kracovie in second by what The New York Times called "the smallest of noses" with American horse Tie Silk in third. The victory made Su Mac Lad the first American horse to take the title.

Dancer rode New Zealand horse Cardigan Bay to $1 million in winnings in 1968, the first harness horse to surpass that milestone. Dancer and Cardigan Bay appeared together on The Ed Sullivan Show.

In 1995, in his final race, he rode Lifelong Victory to a win in the New Jersey Sires Stakes held at Garden State Park in Cherry Hill, New Jersey.

He earned $1 million in purses in 1964, becoming the first driver to win that much in a single year, and drove Cardigan Bay, the first standardbred horse to win $1 million in career prize money. He drove his 3,781st and final winner in 1995, bringing in $28,002,426 during his career as a driver. He won the Triple Crown three times, with trotters Nevele Pride in 1968 and Super Bowl in 1972, and with pacer Most Happy Fella in 1970. He trained/drove the harness horse of the year seven times, with trotters Su Mac Lad in 1962 and Nevele Pride in 1967 through 1969, and with pacers Albatross in 1971 and 1972 and Keystone Ore in 1976. He won the Hambletonian five times and was inducted into the United States Harness Racing Hall of Fame in 1969.

After surgery to treat an intestinal ailment, his beloved horse Dancer's Crown died three weeks before the 1983 Hambletonian, a horse that would have been favored to win the race. He reluctantly entered the little-known Duenna at the insistence of His family and friends, and won the race, the first filly to win the race in 17 years. Arnold Palmer called the victory "one of the most dramatic moments in sports".

Dancer died at age 78 on September 8, 2005, in his home in Pompano Beach, Florida, from prostate cancer. He was survived by his wife Jody, whom he married in 1985; two sons (one of whom was New Jersey Assemblyman and former Plumsted mayor Ronald Stanley Dancer), two daughters, seven grandchildren, and four great-grandchildren. His first marriage, to Rachel Young in 1947, ended in divorce in 1983.
