= Pacing Triple Crown =

American harness horse racing honor

The Pacing Triple Crown is a series of three major harness races for three-year-old Standardbred pacers. It consists of the Cane Pace, the Messenger Stakes, and the Little Brown Jug. It was inaugurated in 1956, one year after the Trotting Triple Crown. A horse that wins all three races becomes a Triple Crown winner and is presented with the Pacing Triple Crown trophy.

The Little Brown Jug is the oldest of the three races. It has been held since 1946 at the Delaware County Fair in Delaware, Ohio. The Cane Pace was inaugurated in 1955 as the Cane Futurity and was initially raced at Yonkers Raceway; it has been held at Meadowlands Racetrack in East Rutherford, New Jersey since 2015. The Messenger Stakes was founded in 1956 at Roosevelt Raceway and has been raced at Yonkers Raceway in Yonkers, New York, since 2006.

Adios Butler became the first Pacing Triple Crown winner in 1959. There have been 10 Pacing Triple Crown winners: Adios Butler (1959), Bret Hanover (1965), Romeo Hanover (1966), Rum Customer (1968), Most Happy Fella (1970), Niatross (1980), Ralph Hanover (1983), Western Dreamer (1997), Blissful Hall (1999), and No Pan Intended (2003).

== Winners ==
Pacing Triple Crown winners
Horse	Year	Driver	Trainer	Owner
Adios Butler	1959	Clint Hodgins	Paige H. West	Paige H. West and Angelo Pellillo
Bret Hanover	1965	Frank Ervin	Frank Ervin	Richard Downing
Romeo Hanover	1966	George Sholty	Jerry Silverman	Lucky Star Stables and Morton Finder
Rum Customer	1968	Billy Haughton	Billy Haughton	Louis and Connie Mancuso and Kennilworth Farm
Most Happy Fella	1970	Stanley Dancer	Stanley Dancer	Egyptian Acres Stable
Niatross	1980	Clint Galbraith	Clint Galbraith	Clint Galbraith, Elsie Berger, Niatross Stable
Ralph Hanover	1983	Ron Waples	Stewart Firlotte	Waples Stable, Inc., Pointsetta Stables, Inc. (Stewart Firlotte), Grants Direct Stable (Richard Dinner and Norman Keyes)
Western Dreamer	1997	Michel Lachance	William Robinson	Matthew J., Patrick J. Jr. and Daniel J. Daly
Blissful Hall	1999	Ronald Pierce	Benjamin Wallace	Daniel Plouffe
No Pan Intended	2003	David Miller	Ivan Sugg	Peter Pan Stables Inc. (Robert Glazer)
