= Digger Crown =

Swedish Standardbred racehorse

- Breed: Standardbred
- Sire: Lindy's Crown
- Grandsire: Lindy's Pride
- Dam: O'Chita
- Maternal grandsire: Linus T.
- Sex: Stallion
- Foaled: 5 April 1997
- Died: 5 November 2017 (aged 20)
- Country: Sweden
- Colour: Bay
- Breeder: Stall Båtels
- Owner: Digger Svenska AB & Stall Båtels AB
- Trainer: Stig H. Johansson

Record
- 126: 59-16-10

Earnings
- US$3,060,137

Major wins
- Campionato Europeo (2003); Sweden Cup (2004, 2006); Premio Duomo (2004); Gran Premio delle Nazioni (2004); Gran Premio della Lotteria (2005)

Digger Crown (5 April 1997 – 5 November 2017) was a Swedish breeding stallion and racing trotter by Lindy's Crown out of O'Chita by Linus T.

His most prestigious victories include Campionato Europeo (2003), Gran Premio delle Nazioni (2004) and Gran Premio della Lotteria (2005) . At the end of his career, the stallion had earned US$3,060,137. Digger Crown was trained by Swedish champion trainer Stig H. Johansson and competed at a high level for nine years, 2000–2008.

== Racing career ==
=== 2000–2001: three and four years old ===
During the first two years at the tracks, Digger Crown was successful without winning any major events. On a number of occasions, Digger Crown won eliminations to big events such as the Swedish Trotting Criterium (at age 3) as well as the Swedish Trotting Derby and Grand Prix de l'U.E.T. (both at age 4). However, in the finals of the events mentioned, the stallion had less success, although he did finish third in the Derby.

=== 2002: five years old ===
The biggest win of 2002 came in June when he won Sverigeloppet (literally: The Sweden Race) at Solvalla. He followed up that victory by finishing second in the 5-year-old European Championship in Italy a month later. This would prove to be the first of many trips to Italy for Digger Crown.

=== 2003: six years old ===
In March 2003, Digger Crown won a qualifying race to the big Swedish race Olympiatravet. In the final, as favourite, he came in fifth far behind winner Gidde Palema. He finished in the money in several major Swedish races that year (Jubileumspokalen: 4th, Sundsvall Open Trot: 2nd, Åby Stora Pris: 4th) but experienced the greatest success of the year abroad, in Italy. Together with driver/trainer Johansson, the stallion won Campionato Europeo at Cesena and ≈US$190,000 in September.

=== 2004: seven years old ===
Digger Crown made his first attempt to win major Italian event Gran Premio della Lotteria in May 2004, but was disqualified in the elimination. He won the following consolation race. Four weeks later, during the Elitloppet meet at Solvalla, he won the semi-big sprint race Sweden Cup. Even though Digger Crown had failed to reach the final of the Lotteria, he and his connections were to be successful in Italy during 2004. First, in June, they won Premio Duomo in Florence. In November, they were victorious in Gran Premio delle Nazioni at San Siro. Between those two events, the stallion participated in a couple of other major Italian races. In Citta di Montecatini, the pattern from the Lotteria was repeated. A disqualification in the eliminations was followed by a win in the consolation race. As a reigning champion, the stallion finished second and fifth in the two heats of Campionato Europeo. Earlier, in July, Digger Crown made his first and last start in Germany when he finished second in Elite-Rennen at Gelsenkirchen.

=== 2005: eight years old ===
At age eight, Digger Crown tried once more to win Gran Premio della Lotteria at Agnano, Naples. The trotter won both an elimination and the final as heavy favourite, giving Johansson a fourth win in the prestigious event. The victory was the most lucrative in the stallion's career. The winner's purse was ≈US$275,000. Digger Crown subsequently got an invitation to Elitloppet at Solvalla, one of trotting's most prestigious events. Trainer Johansson and the horse's owner accepted, and Digger Crown made his one and only start in his home tracks biggest race. He finished second in the elimination heat behind favourite Gidde Palema, earning him a place in the final, where he went off-stride and was disqualified. A few weeks later, Digger Crown made a rare start in France. In Prix Rene Balliere, raced over 2,100 meters (≈1 1/3 mile) at Vincennes, Paris, he finished sixth in 1:10.5 (km rate), a time that was to be the stallion's best mark of his entire career.

=== 2006: nine years old ===
After failing to defend his title in Gran Premio della Lotteria, Digger Crown won his second Sweden Cup at Solvalla, narrowly beating Finnish Passionate Kemp. The year also brought victories in a couple of other semi-big races, like Årjängs Stora Sprinterlopp and Frances Bulwarks lopp, as well as a third win in Gotlandslöpningen at Visby, the biggest race on Digger Crown's native Gotland. From this season and on, Erik Adielsson was the driver of the stallion, since Stig H. Johansson quit racing at the end of 2005.

=== 2007: ten years old ===
The most lucrative effort of 2007 was the win in Norrbottens Stora Pris at Boden in June. Digger Crown finished as runner-up in Finnish St. Michel Race, driven by Thomas Uhrberg. In Gran Premio Citta' di Montecatini in Italy, he and Adielsson won an elimination heat, but was disqualified in the final. In October, the stallion made a second fruitless attempt (the first was made in 2002) to claim the Swedish Championship.

=== 2008: eleven years old ===
Digger Crown's last year on the tracks came to an early end in the summer, when the stallion was injured. Prior to that, he had won a couple of races within the Swedish weekly series Gulddivisionen, and finished third in Norwegian Forus Open as well as in Finnish St. Michel Race. The latter would prove to be Digger Crown's last race, and it meant a repeat of his kilometer rate record mark 1:10.5, but this time over a shorter distance, one mile.

== Retiring from racing ==
The horse's retirement was announced in February 2009 by trainer Stig H. Johansson. Digger Crown was by that time still troubled by the injury in the splint bone of his right rear leg he had suffered in the previous summer. Together with the owners, Johansson therefore made the decision to end Digger Crown's racing career. Upon his retirement, Digger Crown had earned US$3,060,137 in 126 starts that brought 59 victories. In all years on the tracks but his first, he made more than 1 million SEK (US$168,000).

== Stud record ==
Shortly after the decision to retire Digger Crown was official, it was reported that he would move to a stud farm in Italy. The owner also decided to let their own broodmares get covered by Digger Crown. Among those mares are Nealy Lobell, five times participant of Elitloppet. The stud farm that Digger Crown was installed in was Allevamento Folli near Bologna. When Swedish king Carl XVI Gustaf and Queen Silvia visited Italy in late March 2009, they received framed photographs from Vasco Errani, president of the region Emilia-Romagna, where Bologna is situated. One of the photos showed Digger Crown driven by Stig H. Johansson.

== Pedigree ==
Pedigree of Digger Crown (Sweden)
Sire Lindy's Crown (USA)	Lindy's Pride (USA)	Star's Pride (USA)	Worthy Boy (USA)
Sire Lindy's Crown (USA)	Lindy's Pride (USA)	Star's Pride (USA)	Star Drift (USA)
Sire Lindy's Crown (USA)	Lindy's Pride (USA)	Galena Hanover (USA)	Spencer Scott (USA)
Sire Lindy's Crown (USA)	Lindy's Pride (USA)	Galena Hanover (USA)	Grace Hanover (USA)
Sire Lindy's Crown (USA)	Speedy Toe (USA)	Speedy Scot (USA)	Speedster (USA)
Sire Lindy's Crown (USA)	Speedy Toe (USA)	Speedy Scot (USA)	Scotch Love (USA)
Sire Lindy's Crown (USA)	Speedy Toe (USA)	Missile Toe (USA)	Florican (USA)
Sire Lindy's Crown (USA)	Speedy Toe (USA)	Missile Toe (USA)	Worth A Plenty (USA)
Dam O'Chita (Denmark)	Linus T. (USA)	Speedy Crown (USA)	Speedy Scot (USA)
Dam O'Chita (Denmark)	Linus T. (USA)	Speedy Crown (USA)	Missile Toe (USA)
Dam O'Chita (Denmark)	Linus T. (USA)	Gretchen Ann (USA)	Ayres (USA)
Dam O'Chita (Denmark)	Linus T. (USA)	Gretchen Ann (USA)	Flicka Frost (USA)
Dam O'Chita (Denmark)	Anita Holmbo (Denmark)	Francis Senator (Denmark)	Casino the Great (Denmark)
Dam O'Chita (Denmark)	Anita Holmbo (Denmark)	Francis Senator (Denmark)	Rosita Senator (Denmark)
Dam O'Chita (Denmark)	Anita Holmbo (Denmark)	Miss Fårup (Denmark)	Chalmer's Boy (USA)
Dam O'Chita (Denmark)	Anita Holmbo (Denmark)	Miss Fårup (Denmark)	Catharina Frisco (Denmark)
