= Stefan Melander =

Swedish horse trainer

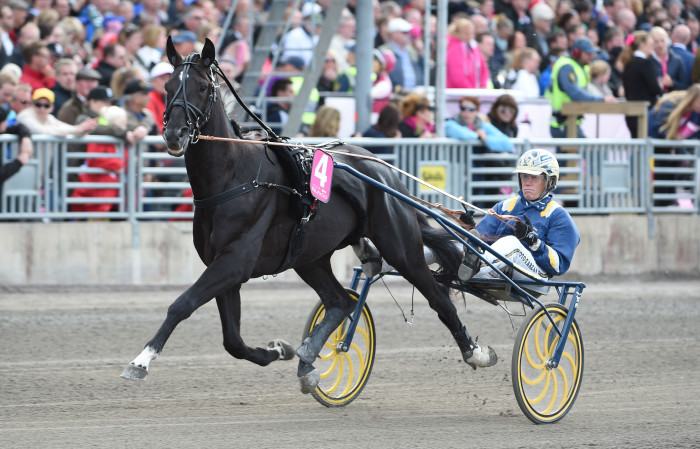
- Stefan Melander and Nuncio.

Personal information
- Born: 23 November 1957 (age 68) Spånga, Stockholm County, Sweden
- Occupations: Harness racing driver and trainer

Horse racing career
- Sport: Horse racing

Major racing wins
- Prix d'Amérique (2006); International Trot (1995); Hambletonian Stakes (2001); Elitloppet (2010, 2016); Sundsvall Open Trot (2004, 2016); Swedish Trotting Criterium (1998); Sprintermästaren (2000, 2002, 2015, 2016); Jubileumspokalen (2009, 2012, 2016); Copenhagen Cup (2017); Oslo Grand Prix (2016); Campionato Europeo (2001); UET Trotting Masters (2016)

Racing awards
- Trainer of the Year (Sweden) (1998, 2001, 2012)

Honours
- Trotting Hall of Fame (Sweden) (inducted in 2014)

Significant horses
- Scarlet Knight, Iceland, Gigant Neo, Nuncio
- Updated on 17 November 2017

Bertil Stefan Melander (born 23 November 1957 in Spånga, Stockholm County) is a Swedish harness racing horse trainer and driver based at Åby-Farm in Enköping, Sweden.

Among the horses he has trained are top trotters Scarlet Knight, Iceland, Gigant Neo and Nuncio. Together with these and other horses, Melander has won numerous major races, including Elitloppet (two times), Hambletonian Stakes (once) and Prix d'Amérique (once). When he won Hambletonian Stakes at Meadowlands Racetrack with Scarlet Knight in August 2001 Melander became the first horseman to bring a U.S.-breed trotter trained and developed in Europe to the U.S. and win the Hambletonian.
