= Ina Scot =

Swedish Standardbred racehorse

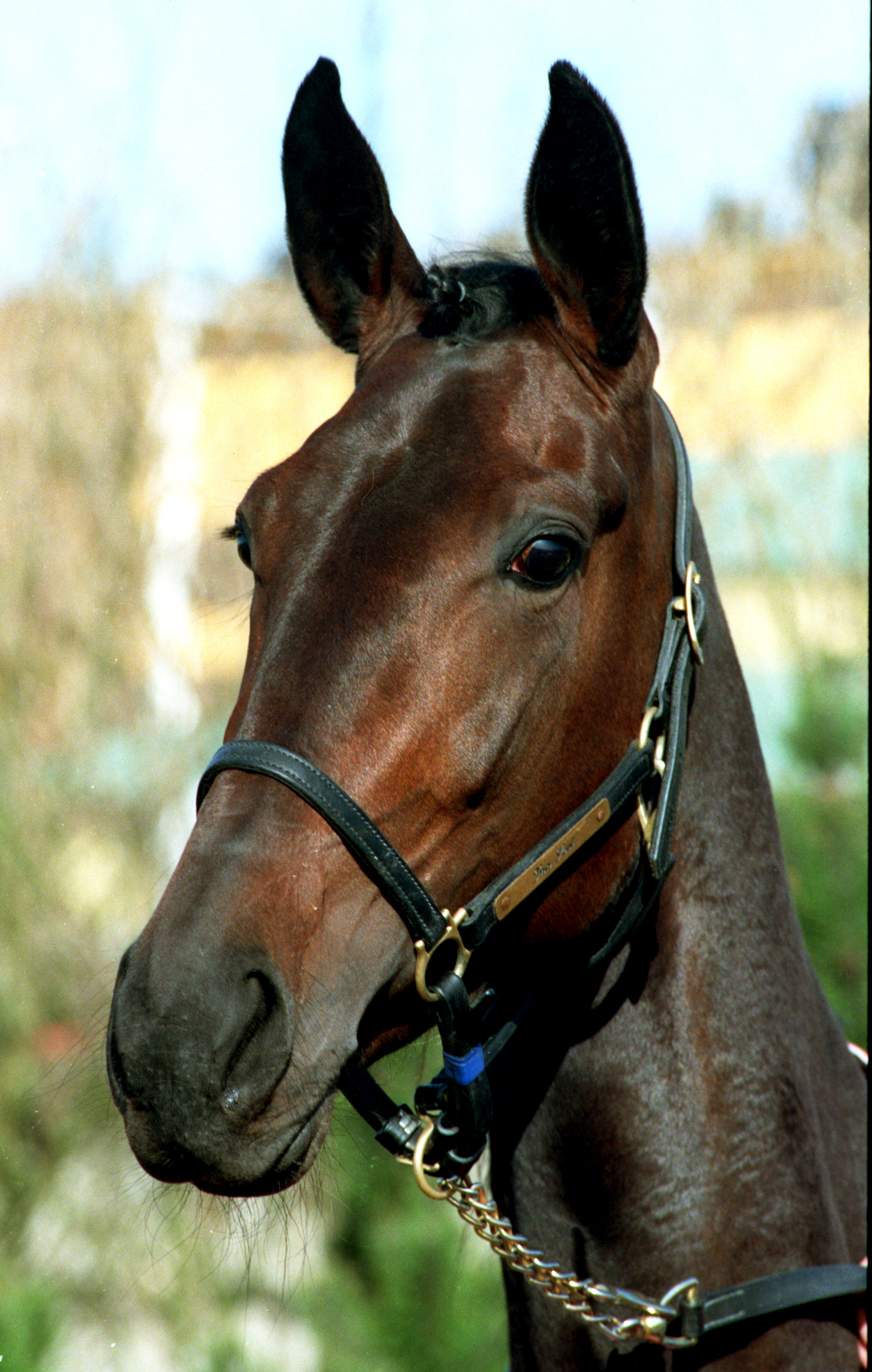
- Ina Scot
- Breed: Standardbred
- Sire: Allen Hanover
- Grandsire: Super Bowl
- Dam: Lovina Grefgård
- Maternal grandsire: Mad Scot
- Sex: Mare
- Foaled: June 22, 1989
- Country: Sweden
- Colour: Dark bay
- Breeder: Carl Henrik Brandel
- Owner: Ina-Q AB & Kjell P Dahlström AB
- Trainer: Kjell P. Dahlström

Record
- 90: 54-11-6

Earnings
- US$2,963,019

Major wins
- Färjestads Nordiska Treåringspris (Sweden) (1992); Swedish Trotting Criterium (Sweden) (1992); Breeders Crown (Sweden) (1992, 1993); Drottning Silvias Pokal (Sweden) (1993); Stochampionatet (Sweden) (1993); Swedish Trotting Derby (Sweden) (1993); Grand Prix de l'U.E.T. (Europe) (1993); Forus Open (Norway) (1994); St. Michel Race (Finland) (1994); Prix d'Amérique (France) (1995); Gran Premio della Lotteria (Italy) (1995); Oslo Grand Prix (Norway) (1996)

Awards
- Horse of the Year Award (Sweden) (1992, 1993, 1995); 3-year-old of the Year (Sweden) (1992); 4-year-old of the Year (Sweden) (1993)
- Last updated on: 2009-01-31.

Ina Scot (June 22, 1989 – December 21, 2013) was a Swedish racing trotter by Allen Hanover out of Lovina Grefgård by Mad Scot.

Her most prestigious victories included the Swedish Trotting Criterium (Swedish: Svenskt Travkriterium) (1992), the Swedish Trotting Derby (Swedish: Svenskt Travderby) (1993), Grand Prix de l'U.E.T. (1993), Prix d'Amérique (1995), Gran Premio della Lotteria (1995) and Oslo Grand Prix (1996). At the end of her career, the mare had earned US$2,963,019. Her 31 consecutive wins between April 28, 1992 and March 7, 1994 was a new world record. Ina Scot was awarded the Horse of the Year Award in Sweden for 1992, 1993 and 1995.

== Early years ==
As a filly, Ina Scot was discovered and purchased by Swedish horseman Kjell P. Dahlström close to his farm, Hassangården, outside Tranås, Sweden. Dahlström was the mare's trainer during her entire career, and either he or his then-wife Helen A. Johansson drove Ina Scot in all of her 90 races.

== Racing career ==
=== 1991 - 2 years old ===
Ina Scot made her competitive debut as a two-year-old on August 26, 1991, at her home racetrack, Mantorp. She won that race as well as three other events during 1991. In the biggest Swedish event for trotters two years old, Svensk Uppfödningslöpning, she finished fifth.

=== 1992 - 3 years old ===
Ina Scot did not win any of her first three races in 1992, but after that, she started to line up victories. She won a world-record-breaking 31 straight times between April 28, 1992, and March 7, 1994. During this run, at age three, she claimed major Swedish stakes races Färjestads Nordiska Treåringspris, the Swedish Trotting Criterium and Breeders Crown open for 3-year-old mares.

=== 1993 - 4 years old ===
As a four-year-old, Ina Scot won all the events she participated in. Always the heavy favourite, she took prestigious trophies like Drottning Silvias Pokal, Stochampionatet, the Swedish Trotting Derby, Grand Prix de l'U.E.T. (her first race abroad), and the Breeders Crown open for mares age four. Her track record was 17 for 17, and she was accompanied by Dahlström at all these occasions. Ina Scot earned US$1,003,789 in 1993.

=== 1994 - 5 years old ===
In her debut of 1994, in a minor race at home track Mantorp on March 7, Ina Scot's winning streak came to an end. On April 16, she entered her first major event for seasoned trotters, Olympiatravet at Åby. Together with Dahlström, she finished fourth, but they avenged the loss a fortnight later when they claimed Forus Open in Norway. Her next big task was the Swedish Elitloppet at Solvalla in Stockholm, one of the world's premiere international trotting events. However, Dahlström and Ina Scot failed to progress from the eliminations. Later in the summer, the mare won the St. Michel Race in Mikkeli, Finland. She finished outside the money in big events like Jubileumspokalen at Solvalla and Preis der Besten in Munich, Germany but won a couple of smaller domestic races. 20 races during the year meant 10 wins and US$291,384.

=== 1995 - 6 years old ===
==== The historic win in Prix d'Amérique ====
In early 1995, Ina Scot and her connections attended the Vincennes winter meeting in Paris, France. On January 15, they got nothing out of Prix de Belgique. Two weeks later, they competed in Prix d'Amérique, the biggest race in France and one of the greatest harness events in the world. Helen A. Johansson, who sat up behind Ina Scot in Prix d'Amérique, was the first woman ever to drive in the race. With a soft hand, Johansson guided her mare past the favourite, French Vourasie, in the stretch. Thus, Johansson became both the first woman to race in Prix d'Amérique and the first woman to win the event.

The year brought another huge win. In May, Ina Scot claimed the big international Italian event Gran Premio della Lotteria at Agnano, Naples. For the second time, she failed to reach the final of Elitloppet. She took part of, and had moderate success in, other major Swedish races like Olympiatravet, Hugo Åbergs Memorial and Jubileumspokalen. Abroad, she raced at among others Norwegian racetrack Bjerke in Oslo, German track Gelsenkirchen, and San Siro in Milan, but none of these trips resulted in victories.

In 1995, Ina Scot made 23 starts out of which she won eight. She earned US$967,627 that year.

=== 1996 - 7 years old ===
In Ina Scot's last year on the tracks, her connections chose a similar start of the campaign as in previous year. First the mare entered Prix de Belgique and two weeks later Prix d'Amérique. The success of 1995 was not repeated, as Ina Scot and driver Johansson finished fourth in Prix d'Amérique, before they rounded off the last French trip by ending up without money in Prix de France.

After a rest period of a couple of months, Ina Scot returned in April and lost a minor race at home track Mantorp. On May 12, she claimed the Norwegian international race Oslo Grand Prix. Ina Scot then again tried to make it to the Elitloppet final but failed. This marked the end of her career as a racing horse.

The last year on the racetracks gave a total of US$168,227 in six races and one win. Her total earnings during her racing career were US$2,963,019, making her the richest Swedish mare trotter ever.

== Breeding career ==
After quitting racing, Ina Scot started her new career as a breeding mare. Her first offspring, Ambassadeur Brunn, was born in April 1998 before Ina Scot was purchased by German Michael Schröer. During her years in Germany, she gave birth to Nordic Gold November (b. 2000), Oscar November (b. 2001) and Paul November (b. 2002, finalist in the Swedish Trotting Derby 2006). In August 2007, the Italian-born colt Michael November was the most expensive among 63 one-year-olds sold at a horse sale in the Netherlands, costing €66,000. At this time, it was reported that Schröer had sold Ina Scot to Dutch real estate broker Ger Visser.

== Pedigree ==
Pedigree of Ina Scot (Sweden)
Sire Allen Hanover (United States)	Super Bowl (United States)	Star's Pride (United States)	Worthy Boy (United States)
Sire Allen Hanover (United States)	Super Bowl (United States)	Star's Pride (United States)	Star Drift (United States)
Sire Allen Hanover (United States)	Super Bowl (United States)	Pillow Talk (United States)	Rodney (United States)
Sire Allen Hanover (United States)	Super Bowl (United States)	Pillow Talk (United States)	Bewitch (United States)
Sire Allen Hanover (United States)	Amalulu (United States)	Noble Victory (United States)	Victory Song (United States)
Sire Allen Hanover (United States)	Amalulu (United States)	Noble Victory (United States)	Emily's Pride (United States)
Sire Allen Hanover (United States)	Amalulu (United States)	Important (United States)	The Intruder (United States)
Sire Allen Hanover (United States)	Amalulu (United States)	Important (United States)	Ilo Hanover (United States)
Dam Lovina Grefgård (Sweden)	Mad Scot (United States)	Speedy Scot (United States)	Speedster (United States)
Dam Lovina Grefgård (Sweden)	Mad Scot (United States)	Speedy Scot (United States)	Scotch Love (United States)
Dam Lovina Grefgård (Sweden)	Mad Scot (United States)	Mellis (United States)	Star's Pride (United States)
Dam Lovina Grefgård (Sweden)	Mad Scot (United States)	Mellis (United States)	Honey Flower (United States)
Dam Lovina Grefgård (Sweden)	Lovisa (Sweden)	Lowton (France)	D'Estrees (France)
Dam Lovina Grefgård (Sweden)	Lovisa (Sweden)	Lowton (France)	Diane de la Siette (France)
Dam Lovina Grefgård (Sweden)	Lovisa (Sweden)	Uhleen Asa (Sweden)	Calumet Dick (United States)
Dam Lovina Grefgård (Sweden)	Lovisa (Sweden)	Uhleen Asa (Sweden)	Miss Uhleen Asa (Sweden)
