= Victory Tilly =

Swedish Standardbred racehorse (1995–2024)

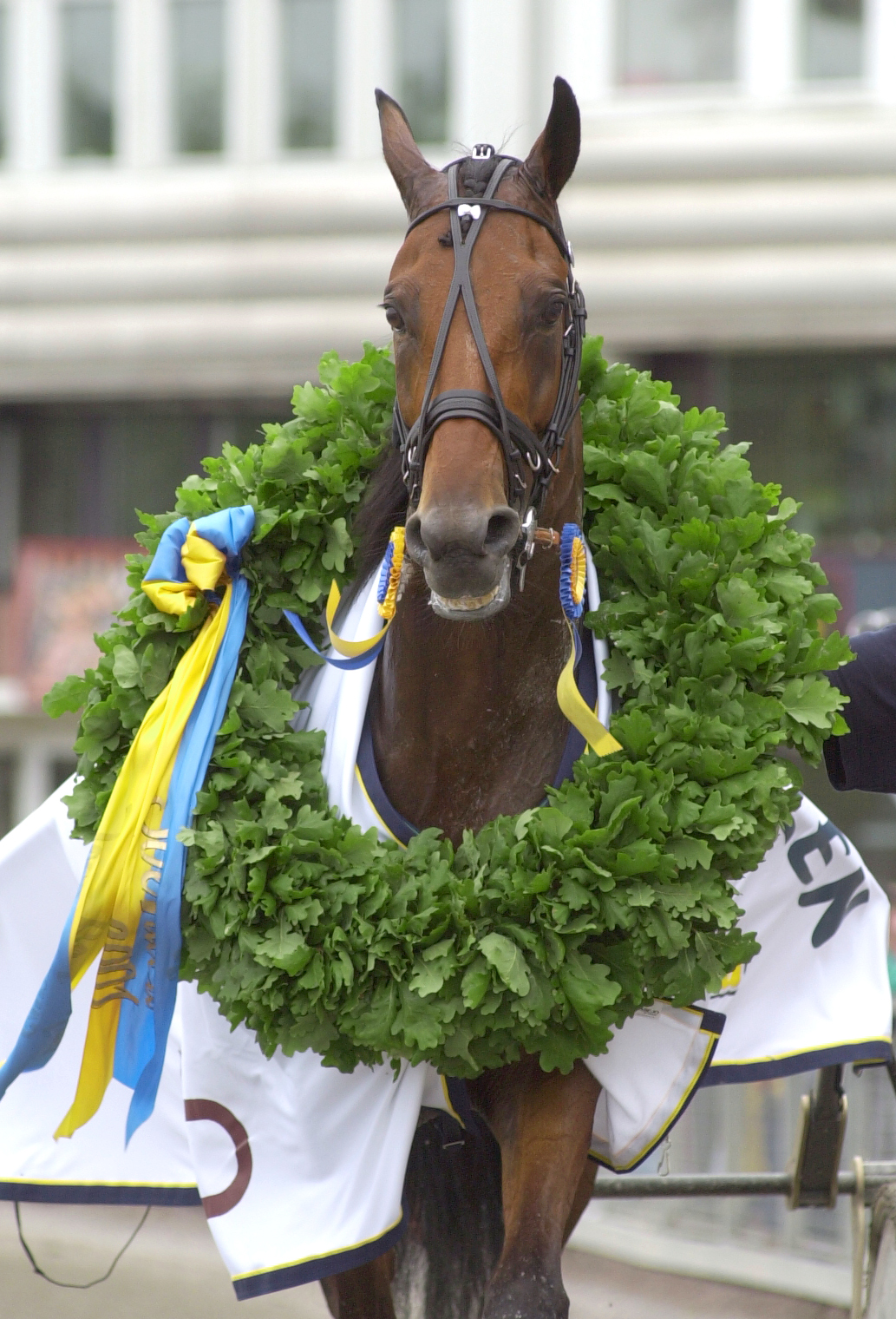
- Victory Tilly in 2001
- Breed: Standardbred
- Sire: Quick Pay
- Grandsire: Star's Pride
- Dam: Icora Tilly
- Maternal grandsire: Fakir du Vivier
- Sex: Gelding
- Foaled: 5 March 1995
- Died: 7 April 2024
- Country: Sweden
- Colour: Bay
- Breeder: Stall Tilly Mg AB
- Owner: Stall Tilly, Stall Kalas
- Trainer: Glen Norman, Stig H. Johansson

Record
- 101: 70-12-4

Earnings
- US$5,168,902

Major wins
- Swedish Trotting Derby (1999); Breeders Crown (1999); Oslo Grand Prix (2000); Elitloppet (2000); Hugo Åbergs Memorial (2000); Jubileumspokalen (2000, 2001); Sundsvall Open Trot (2000, 2001, 2002); Åby Stora Pris (2000, 2002); Copenhagen Cup (2001); Gran Premio Gaetano Turilli (2001); Gran Premio delle Nazioni (2001, 2002); Nat Ray Trot (2002); Gran Premio della Lotteria (2003); Forus Open (2006)

Awards
- Horse of the Year (Sweden) (2000, 2002)
- Last updated on: 2009-02-02.

Victory Tilly (5 March 1995 – 7 April 2024) was a Swedish racing trotter by Quick Pay out of Icora Tilly by Fakir du Vivier.

His most prestigious victories include the Swedish Trotting Derby (Swedish: Svenskt Travderby), Elitloppet, Nat Ray Trot and Gran Premio della Lotteria. At the end of his career, the gelding had earned US$5,168,902 (€4,085,814). He was awarded the Swedish Horse of the Year Award in 2000 and 2002.

== Early years ==
Victory Tilly was born on 5 March 1995, in Almunge, Uppsala municipality, Sweden. He spent his years as a colt at his breeder's, Stall Tilly. Glen Norman was in charge of the training of the stable's race horses and was Victory Tilly's trainer in the horse's early years. During this period, as a two-year-old, Victory Tilly was castrated because of testicle problems. As a gelding, he was ineligible to enter major French events like Prix d'Amérique, that are open only for stallions and mares.

== Racing career ==
=== 1998 - 3 years old ===
On June 17, 1998, Victory Tilly made his racing debut at Solvalla, Stockholm. As the favourite of a race for trotters 3 or 4 years old, he won by 4 and ½ length. In his debut, as well as in all but one of his other races during his 3-year-old season, he was driven by Torbjörn Jansson. On October 4, Victory Tilly took part in the biggest event for Swedish 3-year-olds, the Swedish Trotting Criterium (Svenskt Travkriterium), at Solvalla. The gelding broke stride and finished 6th behind, among others, future star Gidde Palema. During November and December, the horse won three fairly big races, his total earnings to US$173,278. Out of 13 races, Victory Tilly won 8.

=== 1999 - 4 years old ===
Victory Tilly continued to win in early 1999. In connection to the third win of the year, at Solvalla on February 24, a routine doping test was made. After the analyze of the sample, it was revealed that it showed traces of the prohibited substances caffeine and theophylline. Victory Tilly's owner and breeder Hans-Gunnar Tillander of Stall Tilly got hugely disappointed by this affair and, as a consequence, opted to sell all his racing horses. Before the sale, in the last race for trainer Norman, Victory Tilly and Torbjörn Jansson, as heavy favourites, failed to win the major 4-year-old race Konung Gustaf V:s Pokal after being disturbed into galloping.

The new owners, Stall Kalas (English: approximately "Party Stables"), who paid SEK3,500,000 (ca US$420,000 at the time) for the gelding, engaged Stig H. Johansson as new trainer of the horse. Victory Tilly made his debut for Johansson on the Elitloppet Day. Together with Torbjörn Jansson, who was hired as a stand-in driver since Johansson was suspended, Victory Tilly won on the new Swedish record 1:11.8 (km rate, European style of keeping time).

Victory Tilly, along with trainer Johansson in the sulky, won the rest of the races he participated in that year. The biggest win of the year was in the Swedish Trotting Derby, Svenskt Travderby, the richest and most prestigious event for 4-year-olds in Sweden. From gate one, Victory Tilly and Johansson went to the front, where they remained the entire race. Of the SEK1,300,000 gained through the win, Stall Kalas donated 500,000 to the Swedish Cancer Society (Cancerfonden). Later in the autumn, Victory Tilly won another major race, the Swedish Breeders Crown for 4-year-old stallions and geldings.

16 races at age four meant 14 victories, and Victory Tilly earned US$520,108 during the year.

=== 2000 - 5 years old ===
In the first year competing against the domestic and foreign aged elite, Victory Tilly claimed many of Sweden's major events. Before that, he won Norway's biggest race, Oslo Grand Prix, on May 14.

==== Success in Elitloppet ====
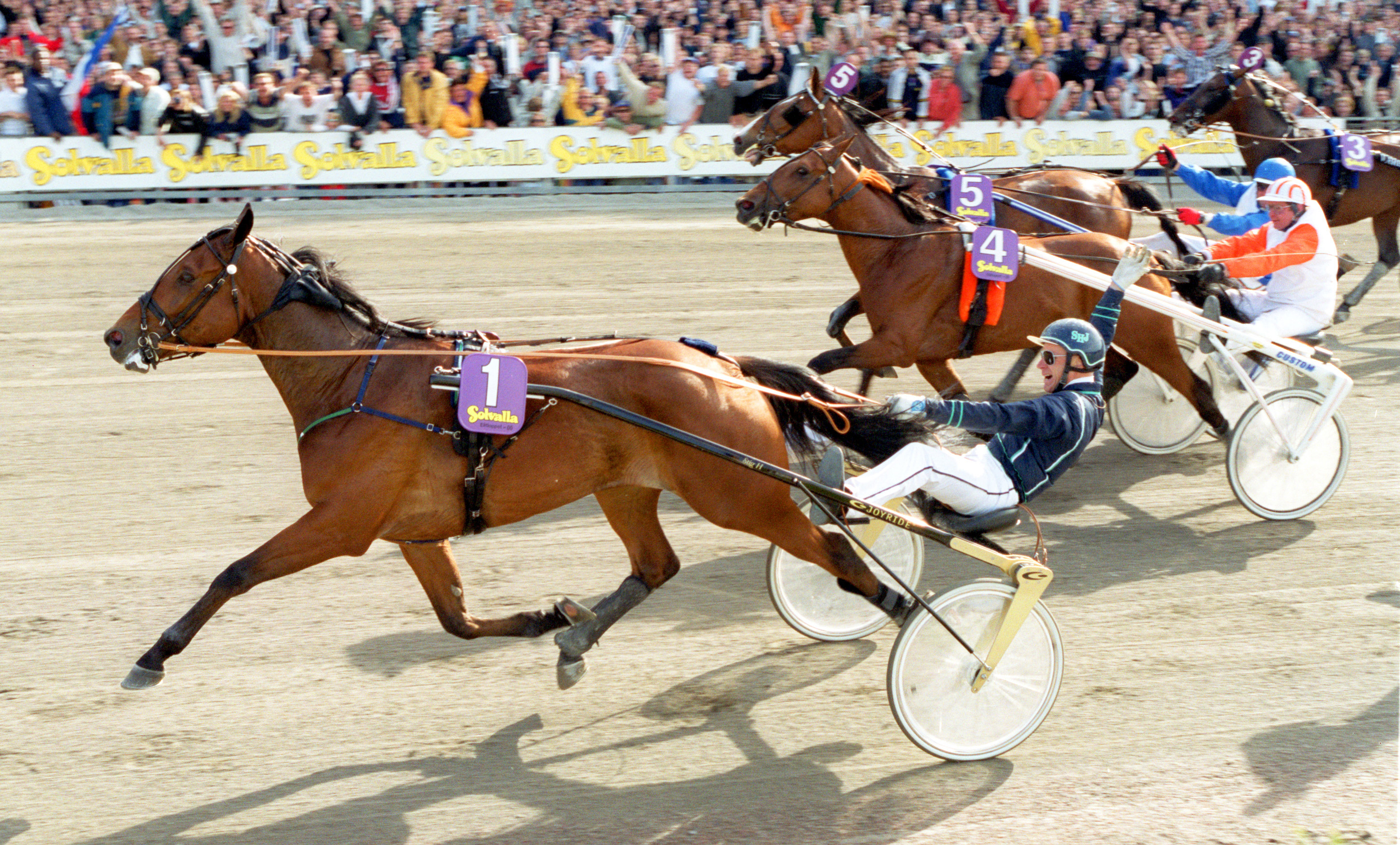
Stig H. Johannson and Victory Tilly wins the 2000 Elitloppet.

Two weeks later, in Elitloppet at their home track Solvalla, Johansson and Victory Tilly faced foreign stars like Italian Varenne and French Général du Pommeau, the reigning Prix d'Amérique champion. Victory Tilly and Johansson won their elimination despite starting from post seven. In the subsequent final, just as in the elimination, Victory Tilly went to the front out of the gate. Général du Pommeau was placed outside in first over. Meanwhile, favourite Varenne galloped shortly. The two horses in the front kept the pace up all through the race, and none of the other contenders posed a threat. Victory Tilly defeated his French opponent, and driver/trainer Johansson threw his whip into the air out of joy as the finish line was crossed and many of the 32,000 attending celebrated. Victory Tilly's 1:53.2 (1:10.5 km rate) mark was a new all-age world record for geldings trotting on a five-eighths of a mile track. After the race, Johansson said that this possibly was the best race ever by a Swedish trotter and that Victory Tilly was the best trotter he had ever trained or driven.

Other than finishing as runner-up in Årjäng in July, the gelding kept winning. During the following months, he won major Swedish races like Hugo Åbergs Memorial at Jägersro, Jubileumspokalen at Solvalla, Sundsvall Open Trot at Bergsåker, and Åby Stora Pris at Åby. In total, Victory Tilly won US$1,366,182 and 12 of 14 entered races in 2000. He was awarded the Swedish Horse of the Year Award for his efforts.

=== 2001 - 6 years old ===
In May, Victory Tilly and Johansson failed to repeat the previous year's successes in both Oslo Grand Prix and Elitloppet. In Oslo, they finished fourth after a race in the pocket position. In Elitloppet, they ended up third, even though they reached their much-preferred front position early. Italian Varenne ran as parker but had no problem cruising to victory down the stretch.

The summer of 2001 brought victories in Copenhagen Cup, Jubileumspokalen, and Sundsvall Open Trot. In October, Victory Tilly competed outside Scandinavia for the first time, when he won Gran Premio Gaetano Turilli at Tor di Valle, Rome. The gelding returned to Italy a few weeks later to win Gran Premio delle Nazioni at San Siro, Milan. At this occasion, Victory Tilly was accompanied by old acquaintance Torbjörn Jansson, since Stig H. Johansson was unavailable due to vacation.

Nine wins out of 16 during the year brought US$887,929.

=== 2002 - 7 years old ===
To compete in his first major event of 2002, Victory Tilly again travelled to Italy. The major international race at Agnano, Gran Premio della Lotteria, ended with the gelding in third, behind Varenne and Legendary Lover K. After finishing fourth in Elitloppet, three victories in native Sweden followed before Victory Tilly travelled to the USA.

==== Racing in the US ====
===== Breeders Crown =====
Even though they were not certain the gelding would make it in time to race in the Breeders Crown at Meadowlands, Victory Tilly's connections paid the US$80,000 required to enter the event. If eliminations had been required a week before the final to decrease the number of contestants, the money would have been of no use. Fortunately for the owners, few enough trotters entered the race, and Victory Tilly could compete in the final.

From the eighth post position, Stig H. Johansson guided Victory Tilly to the front. Fool's Goal passed the Swedish guest and during the latter part of the race, Victory Tilly was positioned in first over. Fool's Goal won the US$1 million event and Victory Tilly came in fourth, beaten by Plesac and Danish Delight as well.

===== Nat Ray - world record =====
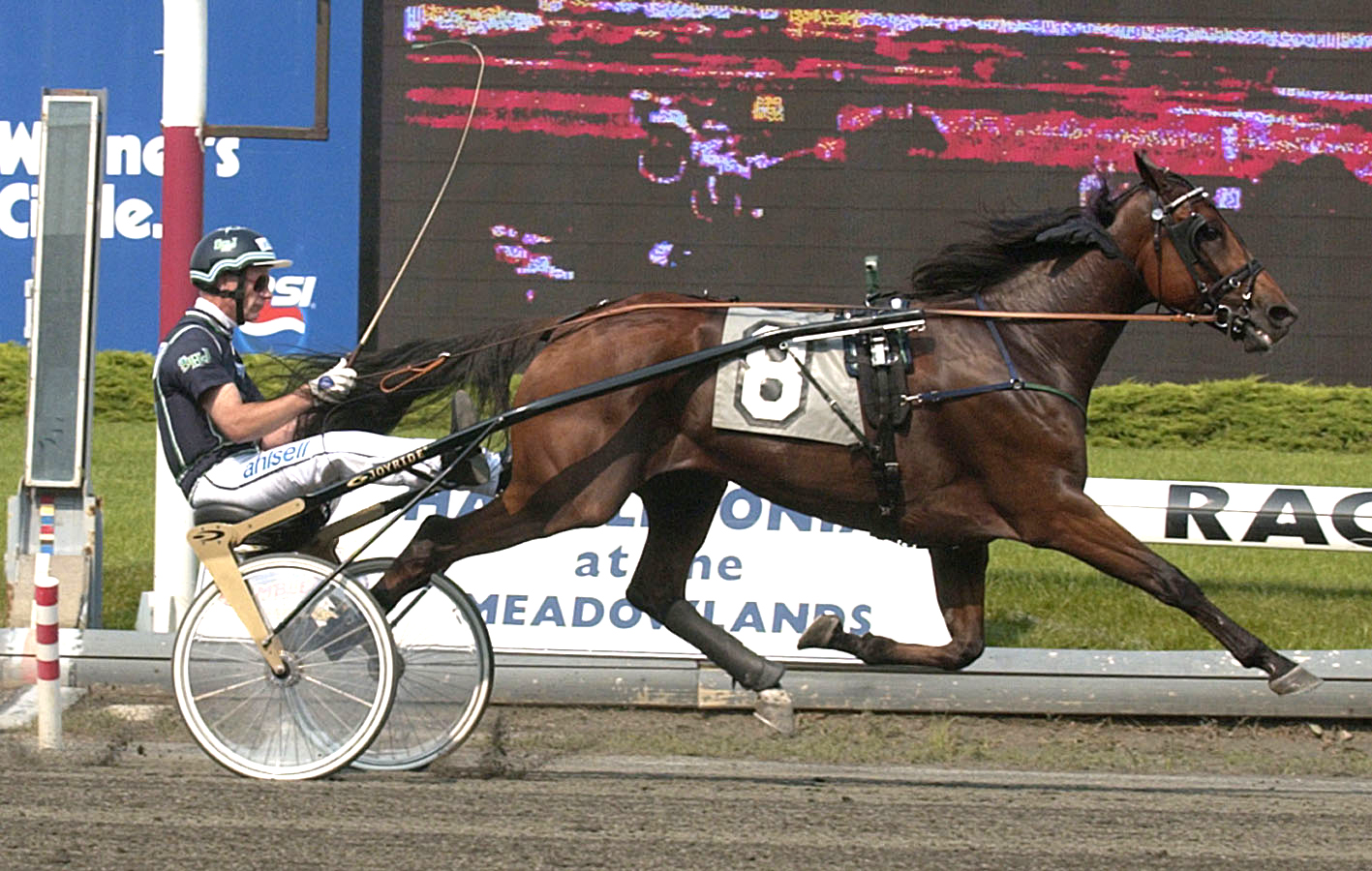
Stig H. Johansson and Victory Tilly wins the 2002 Nat Ray Trot at the Meadowlands Racetrack.

A week later, on August 3, Victory Tilly avenged the loss. In the $500,000 Nat Ray, he defeated, among others, Fool's Goal and Plesac. The mark 1:50.4 (1:08.9 km rate) was a new world record, beating Varenne's race record and Pine Chip's time-trial record with seven and six tenths of a second, respectively.

The record was a valid mark for all trotters until Tom Ridge, guided by driver Ron Pierce, broke it in September 2004 by winning the World Trotting Derby in 1:50.2. Victory Tilly's mark is still a valid world record for all-age geldings.

Back in Sweden, Victory Tilly claimed Sundsvall Open Trot at Bergsåker for a third consecutive time. He won Åby Stora Pris and Frances Bulwark's Race at Solvalla before going to Italy to defend his title in Gran Premio delle Nazioni at San Siro, Milan. From the front, Victory Tilly and Johansson made it back-to-back victories in the event.

During 2002, the trotter entered 16 races, winning 12 of them. Moneywise, it was, by a narrow margin, the best year of his career. Victory Tilly earned US$1,382,625 that year. For the second time, he was awarded the Swedish Horse of Year Award.

=== 2003 - 8 years old ===
Similar to the previous year, Johansson let Victory Tilly enter a few smaller races in the spring before making a trip to Agnano, Naples, and make a second attempt to claim the prestigious Gran Premio della Lotteria. After a successful fight for the front position with Legendary Lover K., the Swedish gelding could not be caught, and the winner's purse, consisting of US$230,000, was Victory Tilly's.

==== Elitloppet and the injury ====
Three weeks later, Victory Tilly and his connections were in place at Solvalla Racetrack, Stockholm, to make a fourth effort to win Elitloppet. A win in the elimination meant a good post position in the final. Nevertheless, Swedish From Above claimed the title while Victory Tilly finished second, one length behind.

Shortly after the race, reports came that Victory Tilly had been injured. The horse was taken to a veterinary clinic, and severe damage to his right hind suspensory was diagnosed. Trainer/driver Johansson stated that the healing process would take at least six months and that there even a risk that Victory Tilly would never return to the track.

There was a plan to again travel over the Atlantic to face North America's top trotters in July and August, but the trip was cancelled. Part of Victory Tilly's medical treatment was to keep him in good shape without stressing his injured leg. This was done by swimming in a lake.

In the abruptly ended racing year of 2003, Victory Tilly won US$448,852 and four races in six attempts.

=== 2004 - 9 years old ===
On April 7, Victory Tilly returned to the tracks for a qualifying race. At Åby Racetrack, on April 29, he made his competitive comeback, 11 months after getting injured in Elitloppet. He returned to his winning ways immediately, and Johansson was happy with his performance. After losing as big favourites at Dannero a couple of weeks later, they ruled out Elitloppet. Victory Tilly claimed Jämtlands Stora Pris and a couple of smaller events but failed to earn a single krona in the bigger races Sundsvall Open Trot and Åby Stora Pris in August and September. The leg problems recurred, which made Johansson end the campaign.

The eight races of the year meant four wins and US$131,603 in prize money.

=== 2005 - 10 years old ===
Now ten years old, Victory Tilly began the 2005 racing at Mantorp on May 16. Although a heavy favourite, he finished second. Johansson was, nonetheless, pleased, and spoke about possibly entering the Breeders Crown later that year. This was not to be, however, since Victory Tilly picked up another injury to his leg. This time, it kept him off the tracks for four months.

When he returned after the latest setback, the gelding did it at Eskilstuna by claiming the easiest victory of his career, according to trainer/driver Johansson. Johansson admitted that Victory Tilly probably never would return to his past heights because of the injuries and age.

On November 26 at Kalmar Racetrack, Victory Tilly and Johansson won the veteran driver's 1000th victory in the rikstoto, a weekly series of races in Sweden. Reaching the milestone together with a horse that close to his heart was "almost too much", as Johansson put it.

In Victory Tilly's second last competitive year, the gelding earned another US$57,165 in seven races, of which four were won.

=== 2006 - 11 years old ===
Victory Tilly's final year on the track started with a couple of smaller domestic races. Johansson then took the gelding to the Forus Racetrack to compete in the major Norwegian event Forus Open. Together with new driver Erik Adielsson (Johansson had quit driving in the end of 2005), the star won in a comfortable way after favourite Steinlager went off-stride. Johansson afterwards admitted himself tempted to take part in Elitloppet once more. Four weeks later, Victory Tilly raced in the big one-mile race. However, Adielsson and the gelding had no success in the eliminations, as French Jag de Bellouet interfered with them.

At Östersund, on June 10, Victory Tilly raced for the last time. Guided by Adielsson, he won the event Jämtlands Stora Pris for the fourth time. During the summer, he was again injured in a hind leg. In October, the gelding still had not shook off his problem. Stig H. Johansson and the owners decided to call it quits. The decision was made official on October 25. On December 30, Victory Tilly was honoured during a ceremony at Solvalla.

During his last year on the tracks, Victory Tilly won three races out of six, which moneywise meant US$201,159 to add to his purse. At the time of his retirement, Victory Tilly had earned US$5,168,902, which made him the richest Swedish trotter ever.

== Life after racing ==
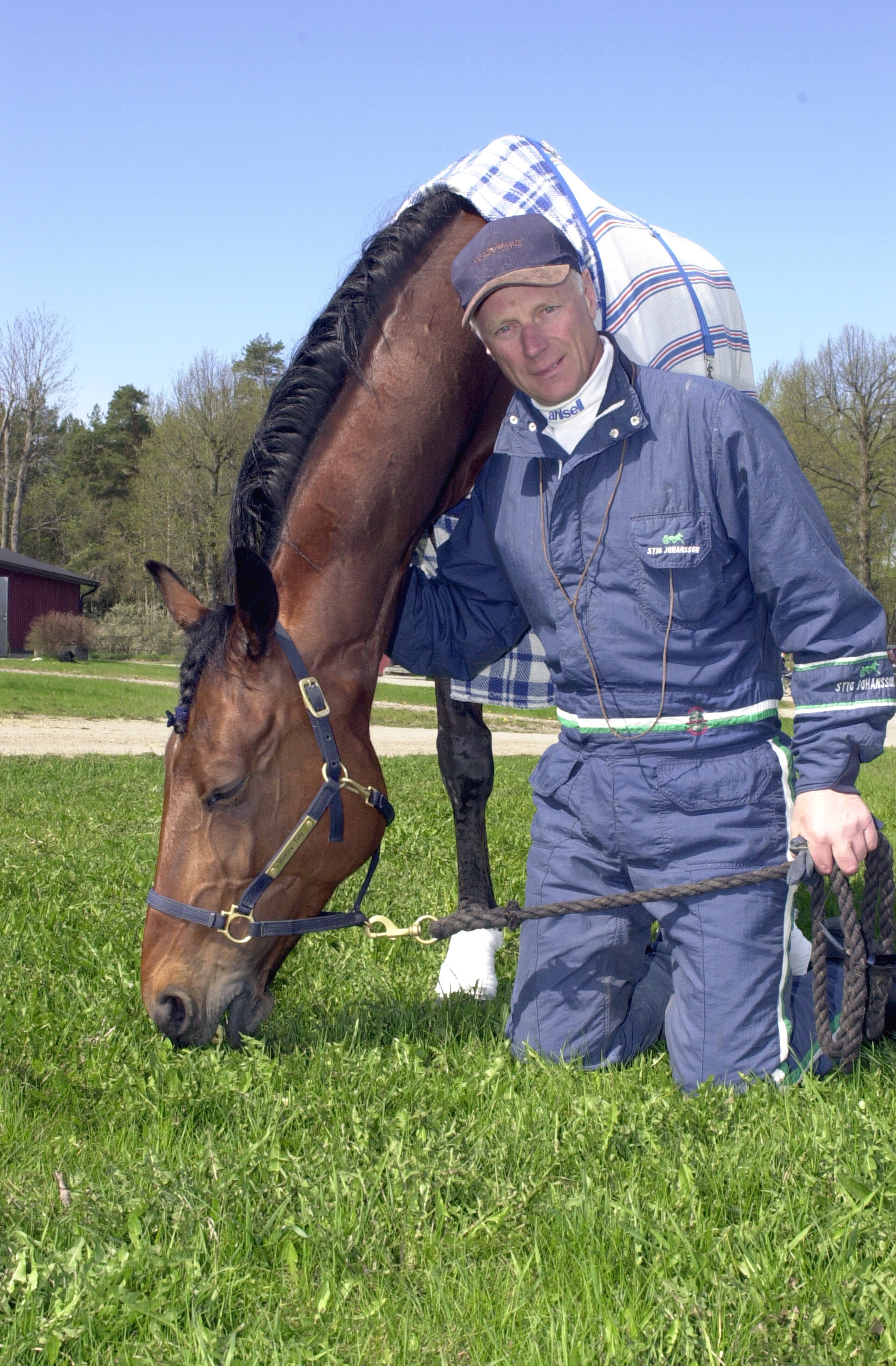
Stig H. Johansson and Victory Tilly in 2003

When Stig H. Johansson in the summer of 2005 turned 60, Stall Kalas gave him Victory Tilly once the horse had retired. Thus, since retiring, Victory Tilly has spent his days at Johansson's farm Stora Alby outside Stockholm.

In March 2007, Johansson announced that there were plans to build a Victory Tilly museum at Stora Alby, where guests can see, among other things, trophies and blankets, as well as visit Victory Tilly.

Victory Tilly died at Stora Alby on 7 April 2024, at the age of 29.

== Pedigree ==
The paternal half of Victory Tilly's pedigree consists of American horses solely. He was sired by Quick Pay (1973–2000), an American stallion that was exported to Sweden in 1978. During his racing career, Quick Pay claimed the Kentucky Futurity and finished second in the Yonkers Trot. In 18 years as a breeding stallion, he sired more than 1,350 foals, 1,117 of which were born in Sweden. Victory Tilly, Lass Zefyr (winner of Breeders Crown and Momarken Grand Prix), Atas Fighter L. (winner of Gran Premio delle Nazioni, Finlandia-Ajo, Prix de France and International Trot), The Onion (winner of Elitloppet, Gran Premio della Lotteria and Åby Stora Pris), Pay Nibs (winner of Campeonato Europeo and St. Michel Race), Lucky Po (winner of the Swedish Trotting Criterium and Konung Gustaf V:s Pokal), Born Quick (winner of the Finnish Trotting Criterium, the Finnish Trotting Derby and Finlandia-Ajo), Sacrifice (winner of Drottning Silvias Pokal) and Pay the Bill (winner of Stochampionatet) are some of the successful trotters Quick Pay sired. He received the title Swedish Elite Stallion and was himself by Star's Pride out of Spry Hanover.

The dam Icora Tilly as well as grand dam Cikora Tilly, third dam Glenna H., and fourth dam Scotch Dot are all considered Elite Mares. Icora Tilly had some success on the tracks (runner-up in the Swedish Trotting Criterium as well as in Gran Premio d'Europa) and as a broodmare, she gave birth to SEK-millionaires Brunton Tilly, Super Tilly and Golden Tilly. The total domination of French horses on Icora Tilly's paternal side, makes Victory Tilly one quarter French, pedigree wise.

Pedigree of Victory Tilly (Sweden)
Sire Quick Pay (United States)	Star's Pride (United States)	Worthy Boy (United States)	Volomite (United States)
Sire Quick Pay (United States)	Star's Pride (United States)	Worthy Boy (United States)	Warwell Worthy (United States)
Sire Quick Pay (United States)	Star's Pride (United States)	Stardrift (United States)	Mr Mcelwyn (United States)
Sire Quick Pay (United States)	Star's Pride (United States)	Stardrift (United States)	Dillcisco (United States)
Sire Quick Pay (United States)	Spry Hanover (United States)	Hoot Mon (United States)	Scotland (United States)
Sire Quick Pay (United States)	Spry Hanover (United States)	Hoot Mon (United States)	Missey (United States)
Sire Quick Pay (United States)	Spry Hanover (United States)	Silken Hanover (United States)	Dean Hanover (United States)
Sire Quick Pay (United States)	Spry Hanover (United States)	Silken Hanover (United States)	Scotch Rhythm (United States)
Dam Icora Tilly (Sweden)	Fakir du Vivier (France)	Sabi Pas (France)	Carioca II (France)
Dam Icora Tilly (Sweden)	Fakir du Vivier (France)	Sabi Pas (France)	Infante II (France)
Dam Icora Tilly (Sweden)	Fakir du Vivier (France)	Ua Uka (France)	Kerjacques (France)
Dam Icora Tilly (Sweden)	Fakir du Vivier (France)	Ua Uka (France)	Flicka (France)
Dam Icora Tilly (Sweden)	Cikora Tilly (Sweden)	King Frances (Sweden)	Scotch Nibs (United States)
Dam Icora Tilly (Sweden)	Cikora Tilly (Sweden)	King Frances (Sweden)	Frances Bulwark (Sweden)
Dam Icora Tilly (Sweden)	Cikora Tilly (Sweden)	Glenna H. (United States)	Trader Horn (United States)
Dam Icora Tilly (Sweden)	Cikora Tilly (Sweden)	Glenna H. (United States)	Scotch Dot (United States)
