= Passionate Kemp =

Finnish Standardbred racehorse

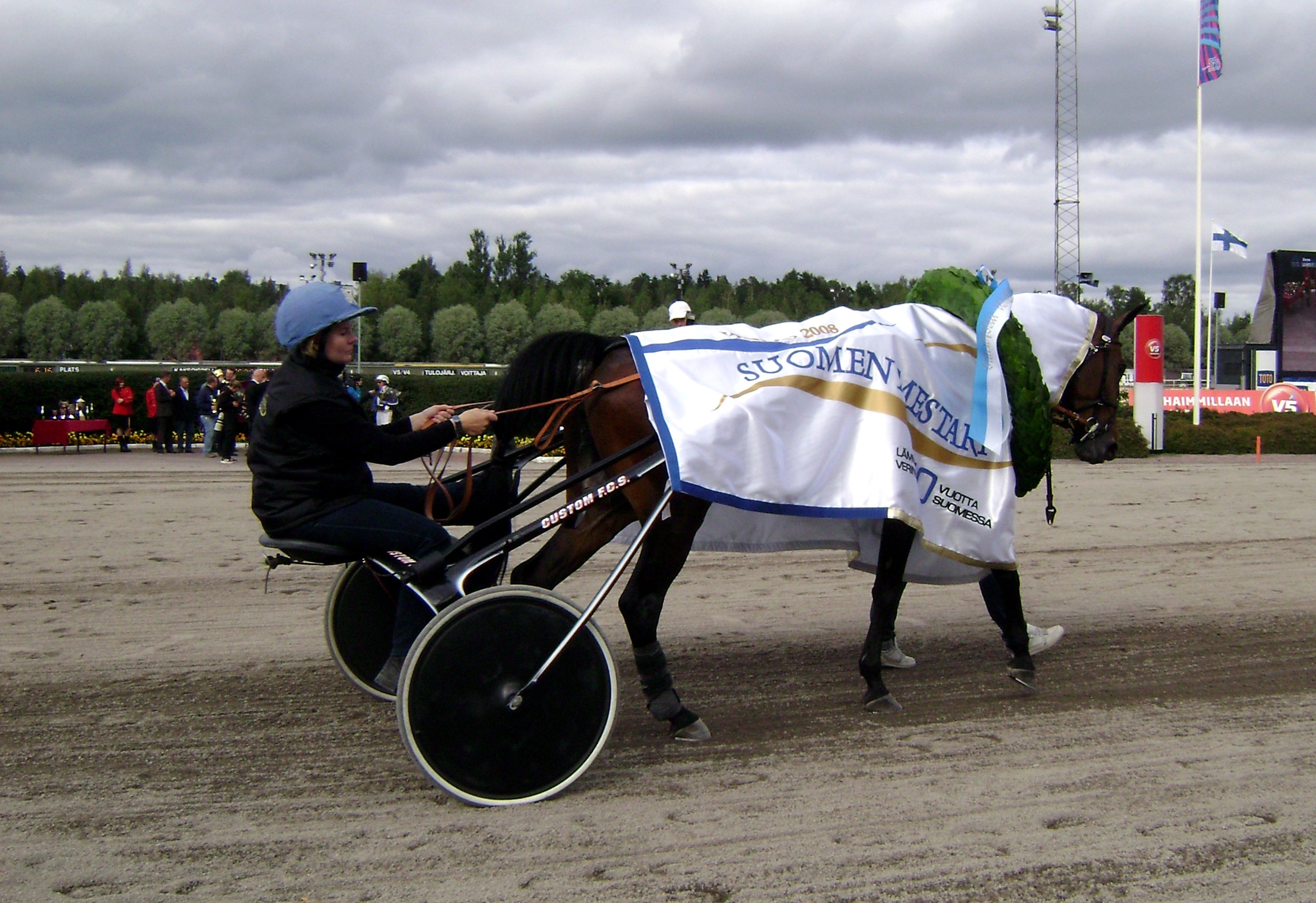
- Breed: Standardbred
- Sire: Lindy Lane
- Grandsire: Valley Victory
- Dam: Sonata Lobell
- Maternal grandsire: Mystic Park
- Sex: Mare
- Foaled: 2001
- Country: Finland
- Colour: Bay
- Breeder: Ravitalli Kemppi (Finland)
- Owner: Talli Hietsut Oy (Finland)
- Trainer: Markku Nieminen (Finland); Stig H. Johansson (Sweden)

Record
- 73: 44-11-3

Earnings
- US$2,251,609 (€1,667,957)

Major wins
- Ulf Thoresens Minneløp (Norway) (2004); Finnish Trotting Criterium (Finland) (2004); Gran Premio Orsi Mangelli (Italy) (2004); Gran Premio Tino Triossi (Italy) (2005); Finnish Trotting Derby (Finland) (2005); Gran Premio Continentale (Italy) (2005); Suur-Hollola-Ajo (Finland) (2006); Gran Premio Gaetano Turilli (Italy) (2006); Gran Premio Freccia d'Europa (Italy) (2006); Galà Internazionale del Trotto (Italy) (2006)
- Last updated on: 2009-04-08.

Passionate Kemp (foaled 2001) is a Finnish former Standardbred trotter by Lindy Lane out of Sonata Lobell by Mystic Park.

Her most prestigious victories include the Finnish Trotting Criterium (2004), Gran Premio Orsi Mangelli (2004), Gran Premio Tino Triossi (2005) and the Finnish Trotting Derby (2005). When it, in April 2009, was reported Passionate Kemp's racing career was ended, the mare had earned US$2,383,158 (€1,667,957), an amount that makes her the richest Finnish trotter ever.

== Pedigree ==
Pedigree of Passionate Kemp (Finland)
Sire Lindy Lane (United States)	Valley Victory (United States)	Baltic Speed (United States)	Speedy Somolli (United States)
Sire Lindy Lane (United States)	Valley Victory (United States)	Baltic Speed (United States)	Sugar Frosting (United States)
Sire Lindy Lane (United States)	Valley Victory (United States)	Valley Victoria (United States)	Bonefish (United States)
Sire Lindy Lane (United States)	Valley Victory (United States)	Valley Victoria (United States)	Victorious Lou (United States)
Sire Lindy Lane (United States)	Lindiliana (United States)	Speedy Crown (United States)	Speedy Scot (United States)
Sire Lindy Lane (United States)	Lindiliana (United States)	Speedy Crown (United States)	Missile Toe (United States)
Sire Lindy Lane (United States)	Lindiliana (United States)	Petrolianna (United States)	Texas (United States)
Sire Lindy Lane (United States)	Lindiliana (United States)	Petrolianna (United States)	Victoria Regina (United States)
Dam Sonata Lobell (United States)	Mystic Park (United States)	Noble Gesture (United States)	Noble Victory (United States)
Dam Sonata Lobell (United States)	Mystic Park (United States)	Noble Gesture (United States)	Important (United States)
Dam Sonata Lobell (United States)	Mystic Park (United States)	Mystic Sign (United States)	Speedster (United States)
Dam Sonata Lobell (United States)	Mystic Park (United States)	Mystic Sign (United States)	Mystical (United States)
Dam Sonata Lobell (United States)	Sonata Hill (United States)	B.F. Coaltown (United States)	Galophone (United States)
Dam Sonata Lobell (United States)	Sonata Hill (United States)	B.F. Coaltown (United States)	Sis Rodney (United States)
Dam Sonata Lobell (United States)	Sonata Hill (United States)	Starlette Hill (United States)	Star's Pride (United States)
Dam Sonata Lobell (United States)	Sonata Hill (United States)	Starlette Hill (United States)	Gay Hill (United States)
