= Zoogin =

Swedish racehorse

- Breed: Standardbred
- Sire: Zoot Suit
- Grandsire: Nevele Pride
- Dam: Ginjette
- Maternal grandsire: Lornjett
- Sex: Stallion
- Foaled: 3 June 1990
- Died: 10 June 2020
- Country: Sweden
- Colour: Dark bay
- Breeder: Lennart Olsson, Lars-Åke Olsson
- Owner: Håkan Andersson
- Trainer: Åke Svanstedt

Record
- 96: 51-19-8

Earnings
- US$2,989,271

Major wins
- Swedish Trotting Criterium (1993); Jubileumspokalen (1995, 1996, 1998); Åby Stora Pris (1995, 1996); Elite-Rennen (1996); Hugo Åbergs Memorial(1996); Oslo Grand Prix (1997); Finlandia-Ajo (1997); Copenhagen Cup (1997); Sundsvall Open Trot (1998)

Awards
- Horse of the Year (Sweden) (1996)
- Last updated on: 2009-01-29.

Zoogin (3 June 1990 – 10 June 2020) was a Swedish racing trotter by Zoot Suit out of Ginjette by Lornjett.

His most prestigious victories include the Swedish Trotting Criterium (Swedish: Svenskt Travkriterium) (1993), Oslo Grand Prix (1997), Finlandia-Ajo (1997) and Copenhagen Cup (1997). At the end of his career, the stallion had earned US$2,989,271 (€2,914,376). He won the Horse of the Year Award in Sweden for 1996.

== Pedigree ==
Pedigree of Zoogin (Sweden)
Sire Zoot Suit (United States)	Nevele Pride (United States)	Star's Pride (United States)	Worthy Boy (United States)
Sire Zoot Suit (United States)	Nevele Pride (United States)	Star's Pride (United States)	Star Drift (United States)
Sire Zoot Suit (United States)	Nevele Pride (United States)	Thankful (United States)	Hoot Mon (United States)
Sire Zoot Suit (United States)	Nevele Pride (United States)	Thankful (United States)	Magnolia Hanover (United States)
Sire Zoot Suit (United States)	Glad Rags (United States)	Greentree Adios (United States)	Adios (United States)
Sire Zoot Suit (United States)	Glad Rags (United States)	Greentree Adios (United States)	Martha Lee (United States)
Sire Zoot Suit (United States)	Glad Rags (United States)	Jewel Rosecroft (United States)	Symbol Gantle (United States)
Sire Zoot Suit (United States)	Glad Rags (United States)	Jewel Rosecroft (United States)	Miss Pearl (United States)
Dam Ginjette (Sweden)	Lornjett (Sweden)	Scotch Nibs (United States)	Nibble Hanover (United States)
Dam Ginjette (Sweden)	Lornjett (Sweden)	Scotch Nibs (United States)	Hattie G. (United States)
Dam Ginjette (Sweden)	Lornjett (Sweden)	Caressa (Sweden)	Whitney Hanover (United States)
Dam Ginjette (Sweden)	Lornjett (Sweden)	Caressa (Sweden)	Lime Will (Sweden)
Dam Ginjette (Sweden)	Ginnie Lite (Sweden)	Black Lite (United States)	Darnley (United States)
Dam Ginjette (Sweden)	Ginnie Lite (Sweden)	Black Lite (United States)	June Mite (United States)
Dam Ginjette (Sweden)	Ginnie Lite (Sweden)	Ginnie (Sweden)	John Scovere (Sweden)
Dam Ginjette (Sweden)	Ginnie Lite (Sweden)	Ginnie (Sweden)	Sister Scotland (Sweden)
