= European Trotting Derby =

- Class: Group One International
- Location: Various European racetracks Europe
- Inaugurated: 1985
- Race type: Harness race for standardbred trotters

Race information
- Distance: approximately 2,100 meters (1.31 mile)
- Qualification: 4-year-old European-born stallions and mares
- Purse: ≈US$607,000 (€460,000)

The European Trotting Derby, also called UET Grand Prix and Grand Prix de l'UET, is an annual Group One harness event that is arranged by the European Trotting Union, UET. The final takes place on a racetrack in one of the member countries of UET. The event is open for 4-year-old European-born trotters and was first raced in 1985. The 2009 final will be hosted by Tampere Racetrack, Finland, and has a purse of approximately US$607,000, or €460,000.

== Racing conditions ==
=== The races ===
To qualify for the European Trotting Derby final, horses must progress from the qualifying races. These races takes place on two racetracks in two countries every year, in 2009 at Vincennes, France and Tampere, Finland.

=== Distance and starting method ===
The distance has most years been 2,100 meters. Some years, a slight variation has been made, but the distance has always been in the interval 2,000-2,140 meters. The race has always been started by the use of auto start.

== Past winners ==
=== Drivers with most wins ===
- 4 - Stig H. Johansson (1985, 1986, 1988, 2001)
- 2 - Dominique Locqueneux

=== Trainers with most wins ===
- 4 - Stig H. Johansson (1985, 1986, 1988, 2001)
- 2 - Jean-Pierre Dubois (1987, 2004)

=== Sires with at least two winning offsprings ===
- 2 - Pershing (Mack the Knife, Atas Rocket)

=== Countries, number of wins ===
- 10 - France
- 9 - Sweden
- 2 - Germany
- 1 - Finland
- 1 - Italy
- 1 - Netherlands

=== Winner with lowest odds ===
- Winning odds: 1.20 - Ina Scot (1993)

=== Winner with highest odds ===
- Winning odds: 22.00 - Progress Value (1994)

=== Fastest winner ===
- 1:11.7 (km rate) - Kiss Melody (2002)

=== All winners of the European Trotting Derby ===
Year	Horse	Driver	Trainer	Winning horse's native country	Odds of winner	Winning time
2008	Qualita Bourbon	Joseph Verbeeck	Jean Baudron	France	1.51	1:13.2
2007	Virgill Boko	Hugo Langeweg J:r	Hugo Langeweg	Netherlands	3.34	1:14.0
2006	Oiseau de Feux	Christian Bigeon	Fabrice Souloy	France		1:14.1
2005	Conny Nobell	Björn Goop	Björn Goop	Sweden	1.73	1:12.9
2004	Daguet Rapide	Pietro Gubellini	Jean-Pierre Dubois	Italy	1.65	1:14.2
2003	Naglo	Örjan Kihlström	Stefan Hultman	Sweden	4.29	1:13.0
2002	Kiss Melody	Dominique Locqueneux	Pierre Desiré Allaire	France	2.63	1:11.7
2001	Abano As	Stig H. Johansson	Stig H. Johansson	Germany	1.90	1:12.7
2000	Com Karat	Dominique Locqueneux	Jan Kruithof	Sweden	2.40	1:14.6
1999	Himo Josselyn	Jean-Michel Bazire	Jean-Michel Bazire	France	2.90	1:14.9
1998	Giant Cat	Nicolas Roussel	Nicolas Roussel	France	5.07	1:15.7
1997	General November	Pekka Korpi	Veijo Kivijoja	Germany	3.00	1:13.2
1996	Elision	Jean-Pierre Viel	Albert Viel	France	2.62	1:15.7
1995	Derby du Gite	Heinz Wewering	Sylvain Leliévre	France	10.01	1:14.5
1994	Progress Value	Lennart Forsgren	Kari Lähdekorpi	Sweden	22.00	1:15.1
1993	Ina Scot	Kjell P. Dahlström	Kjell P. Dahlström	Sweden	1.20	1:14.6
1992	Jexpress Dahlia	Jorma Kontio	Jukka-Pekka Kauhanen	Finland	1.91	1:15.2
1991	Market Leader	Leif Witasp	Leif Witasp	Sweden	11.30	1:15.8
1990	Ultra Ducal	Paul Viel	Paul Viel	France	4.01	1:15.4
1989	Tipouf	Pierre Vercruysse	Pierre Vercruysse	France	2.60	1:17.5
1988	Atas Rocket	Stig H. Johansson	Stig H. Johansson	Sweden	4.37	1:16.6
1987	Rangone	Jean-Pierre Dubois	Jean-Pierre Dubois	France	2.80	1:14.7
1986	Clash Hammering	Stig H. Johansson	Stig H. Johansson	Sweden	3.13	1:15.4
1985	Mack the Knife	Stig H. Johansson	Stig H. Johansson	Sweden	2.20	1:16.6
