= Nuncio (horse) =

American Standardbred racehorse

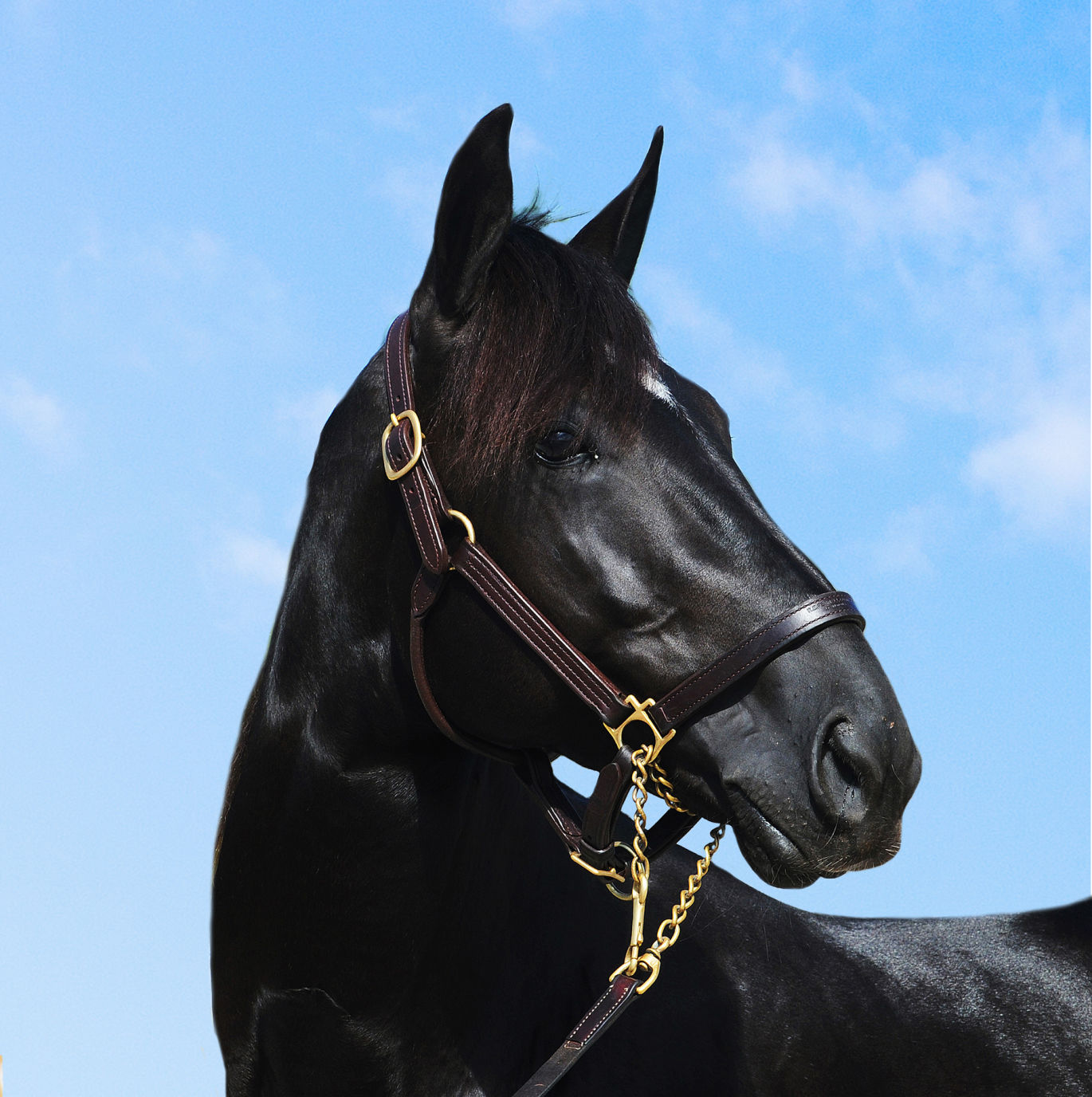
- Breed: Standardbred
- Sire: Andover Hall
- Grandsire: Garland Lobell
- Dam: Nicole Isabelle
- Maternal grandsire: Lindy Lane
- Sex: Stallion
- Foaled: 17 April 2011
- Country: United States
- Color: Black
- Breeder: Russell C. Williams, Hanover Shoe Farms
- Owner: Stefan Melander

Record
- 51: 37-12-2

Earnings
- USD 3,035,094 SEK 27,573,230

Major wins
- Yonkers Trot (2014); Kentucky Futurity (2014); Sprintermästaren (2015); Elitloppet (2016); Jubileumspokalen (2016); Sundsvall Open Trot (2016)

Nuncio (foaled in Hanover, Pennsylvania, 17 April 2011) is a dark racing trotter by Andover Hall out of Nicole Isabelle by Lindy Lane. Nuncio is owned and trained by Stefan Melander at Åby-Farm, Enköping, Sweden.

With Swedish driver Örjan Kihlström, Nuncio won the most prestigious harness race in Scandinavia, the Swedish Elitloppet at Solvalla, on the 29th day of May, 2016, carrying a 3 million Swedish kronor ($360.000) first prize purse.

Furthermore, Nuncio has won several other races, most prominent of which are Kentucky Futurity (2014), Yonkers Trot (2014), Sprintermästaren (2015), the Swedish Breeders Crown (2015), Jubileumspokalen (2016) and Sundsvall Open Trot (2016). Nuncio was also a valiant runner-up at one of the greatest harness racing events in the world, the Hambletonian Stakes (2014).

The combined earnings of the US-born stallion now exceeds 27 million Swedish kronor.
