= Queen L. =

Swedish Standardbred racehorse

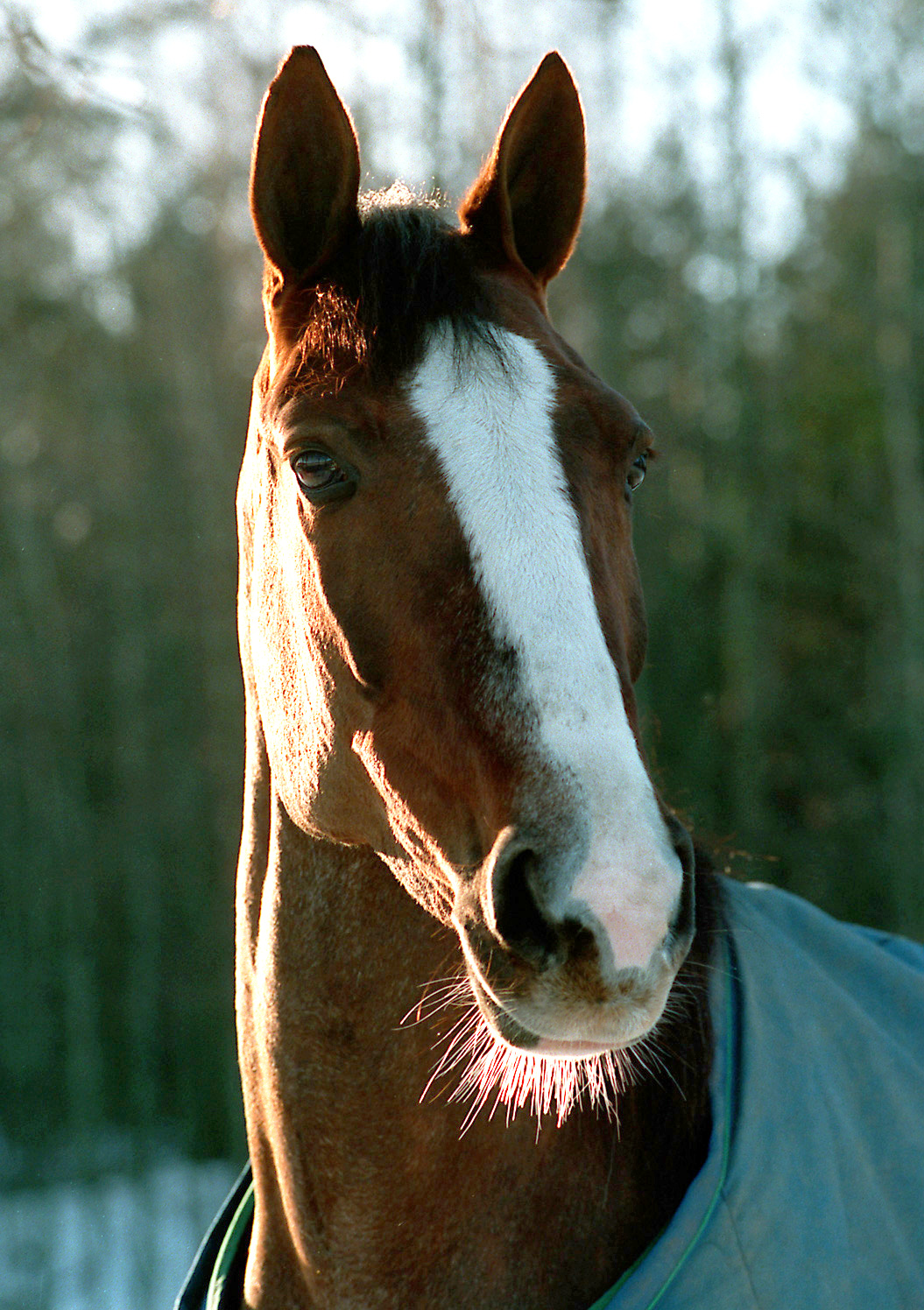
- Queen L. in 1995
- Breed: Standardbred
- Sire: Crowntron
- Grandsire: Speedy Crown
- Dam: Attila L.
- Maternal grandsire: Tibur
- Sex: Mare
- Foaled: 21 May 1986
- Died: 5 December 2013
- Country: Sweden
- Colour: Chestnut
- Breeder: Tore Larsson
- Owner: Stall Ringen
- Trainer: Stig H. Johansson

Record
- 82: 46-10-7

Earnings
- US$2,383,158

Major wins
- Stochampionatet (1990); Swedish Trotting Derby (1990); Swedish Championship (1991, 1993, 1994); Prix d'Amérique (1993); Olympiatravet (1993, 1994); Jubileumspokalen (1993); Åby Stora Pris (1993); Preis der Besten (1993); Prix de France (1995)
- Last updated on: 2009-02-02.

Queen L. (21 May 1986 - 5 December 2013) was a chestnut Standardbred trotter by Crowntron out of Attila L. by Tibur.

Her most prestigious victories include the Swedish Trotting Derby (Swedish: Svenskt Travderby) (1990), Prix d'Amérique (1993) and Prix de France (1995). At the end of her career, the mare had earned US$2,383,158.

== Pedigree ==
Pedigree of Queen L. (SWE)
Sire Crowntron (USA)	Speedy Crown (USA)	Speedy Scot (USA)	Speedster (USA)
Sire Crowntron (USA)	Speedy Crown (USA)	Speedy Scot (USA)	Scotch Love (USA)
Sire Crowntron (USA)	Speedy Crown (USA)	Missile Toe (USA)	Florican (USA)
Sire Crowntron (USA)	Speedy Crown (USA)	Missile Toe (USA)	Worth A Plenty (USA)
Sire Crowntron (USA)	Nessanda (USA)	Rodilo (USA)	Rodney (USA)
Sire Crowntron (USA)	Nessanda (USA)	Rodilo (USA)	Ilo Hanover (USA)
Sire Crowntron (USA)	Nessanda (USA)	Jennyranda (USA)	Jenko Hanover (USA)
Sire Crowntron (USA)	Nessanda (USA)	Jennyranda (USA)	Miranda Hanover (USA)
Dam Attila L. (SWE)	Tibur (FRA)	Fandango (FRA)	Loudeac (FRA)
Dam Attila L. (SWE)	Tibur (FRA)	Fandango (FRA)	Tombelaine (FRA)
Dam Attila L. (SWE)	Tibur (FRA)	Hellenienne (FRA)	Kairos (FRA)
Dam Attila L. (SWE)	Tibur (FRA)	Hellenienne (FRA)	Valsovienne (FRA)
Dam Attila L. (SWE)	Asani II (DEN)	Frosty Hanover (USA)	Star's Pride (USA)
Dam Attila L. (SWE)	Asani II (DEN)	Frosty Hanover (USA)	Flicka Hanover (USA)
Dam Attila L. (SWE)	Asani II (DEN)	Asani (DEN)	Casino the Great (DEN)
Dam Attila L. (SWE)	Asani II (DEN)	Asani (DEN)	F.F. (DEN)
