= Sprintermästaren =

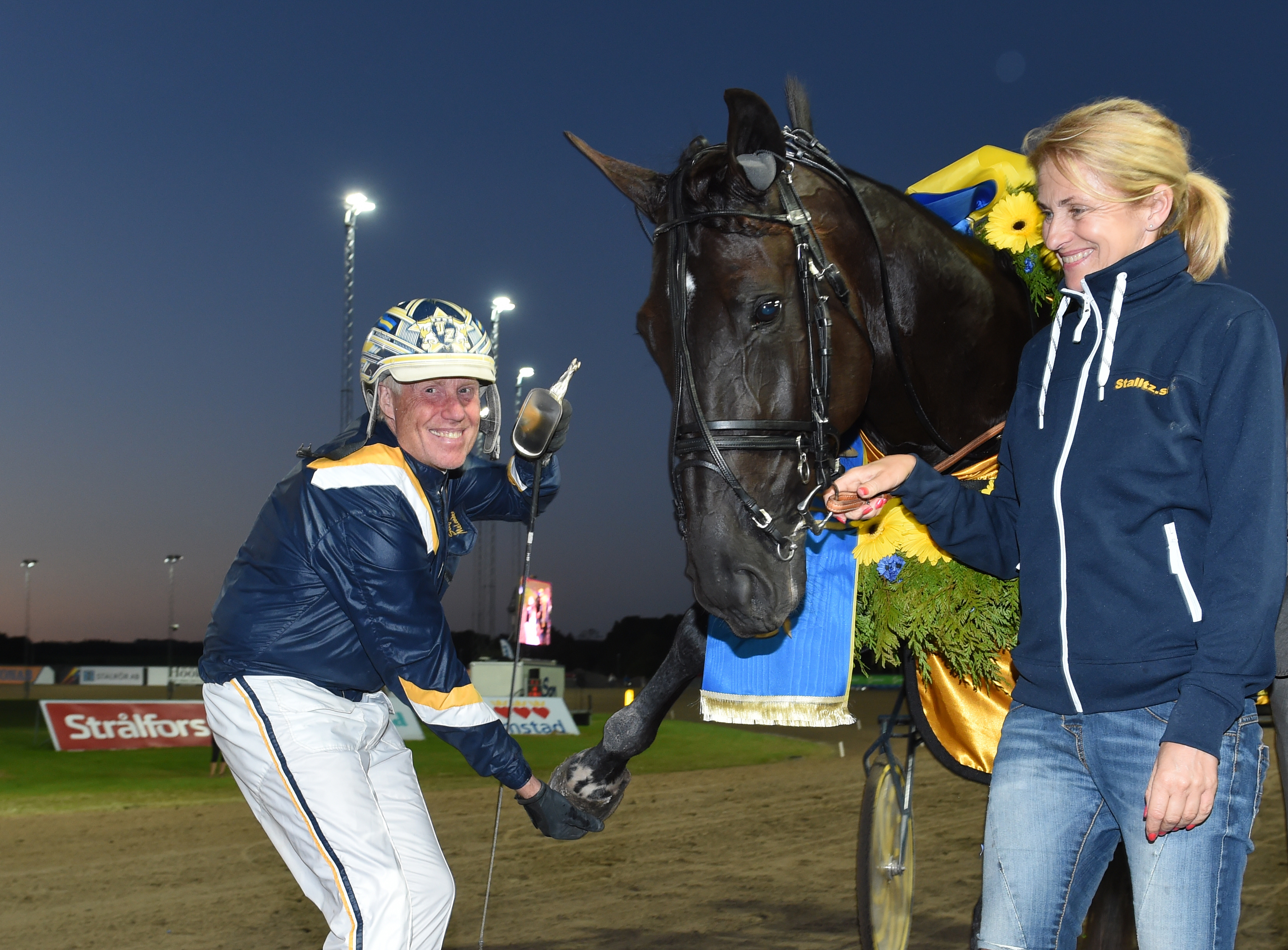
- Nuncio and Stefan Melander after their victory in 2015.
- Class: Group One International
- Location: Halmstad Racetrack, Halmstad, Sweden
- Inaugurated: 1971
- Race type: Harness race for standardbred trotters

Race information
- Distance: 1,609 meters (1 mile)
- Track: Left-handed 1,000 meter track (0.62 mile)
- Qualification: 4-year-olds
- Purse: ≈US$288,000 (€200,000)

Sprintermästaren (literally: "The Sprint Champion") is an annual international Group One harness event for trotters. It is held at Halmstad Racetrack in Halmstad, Sweden, and is a stakes race for 4-year-olds. The purse in the 2011 final was ≈US$288,000 (€200,000), of which the winner Orecchietti won half. The event is sometimes referred to as "Sweden's Hambletonian".

== Racing conditions ==
From the beginning, Sprintermästaren was open only for Swedish four-year-old trotters. In 2002, the conditions were changed and the event has since then been open for foreign four-year-olds as well. The distance, one mile, has been the same since the beginning of the event in 1971. The final of the event is preceded by a number of elimination races, taking place the same day. Since 1995, the number of elimination heats has been three per year.

== Past winners ==
=== Drivers with most wins ===
- 5 - Stig H. Johansson
- 5 - Örjan Kihlström
- 2 - Erik Adielsson
- 2 - Stefan Melander
- 2 - Robert Bergh
- 2 - Johnny Takter

=== Trainers with most wins ===
- 6 - Stig H. Johansson
- 4 - Stefan Melander
- 3 - Stefan Hultman
- 3 - Robert Bergh
- 2 - Sören Nordin

=== Sires with at least two winning offsprings ===
- 3 - Andover Hall (Brad de Veluwe, Nuncio, Perfect Spirit)
- 2 - Count's Pride (Alex Pride, Gaston Pride)
- 2 - Speedy Somolli (Mr Lavec, Regent Broline)
- 2 - Super Arnie (Beijing Boy, Dust All Over)
- 2 - Super Bowl (Active Bowler, Ultimo H.)
- 2 - Tibur (Callit, Drottning Sund)

=== Winning stallions that have also sired winners ===
- Mr Lavec (1995), sire of First Lavec (2001)

=== Winner with lowest odds ===
- Winning odds: 1.24 - Charme Asserdal (1977)

=== Winner with highest odds ===
- Winning odds: 42.55 - Beijing Boy (1999)

=== Fastest winner (finals only) ===
- 1:09.3 (km rate) - Uncle Lasse (2016)

=== All winners of Sprintermästaren ===
Year	Horse	Driver	Trainer	Odds of winner	Winning time (km rate)
2018	Perfect Spirit	Örjan Kihlström	Daniel Redén	2.45	1:10.2
2017	Diamanten	Christoffer Eriksson	Robert Bergh	2.91	1:10.0
2016	Uncle Lasse	Örjan Kihlström	Stefan Melander	3.10	1:09.3
2015	Nuncio	Stefan Melander	Stefan Melander	1.34	1:10.0
2014	Happy Days	Johnny Takter	Michael Lönborg	8.43	1:10.7
2013	Quid Pro Quo	Ulf Ohlsson	Svante Båth	3.47	1:11.0
2012	Brad de Veluwe	Tuomas Korvenoja	Tuomas Korvenoja	2.42	1:09.7
2011	Orecchietti	Örjan Kihlström	Stefan Hultman	4.46	1:10.7
2010	You Bet Hornline	Robert Bergh	Robert Bergh	8.78	1:11.1
2009	Lavec Kronos	Lutfi Kolgjini	Lutfi Kolgjini	7.75	1:10.7
2008	Dust All Over	Örjan Kihlström	Roger Walmann	3.90	1:11.4
2007	Naughty Nunu	Erik Adielsson	Stig H. Johansson	8.42	1:11.9
2006	Fantasy Broline	Robert Bergh	Robert Bergh	8.09	1:11.9
2005	Profit Ås	Erik Adielsson	Kari Lähdekorpi	14.06	1:11.3
2004	Gentleman	Örjan Kihlström	Stefan Hultman	2.55	1:11.8
2003	Calvin Capar	Hans-Owe Sundberg	Stefan Hultman	4.59	1:12.3
2002	Scarlet Knight	Stefan Melander	Stefan Melander	1.40	1:12.5
2001	First Lavec	Jim Frick	Jim Frick	4.26	1:13.2
2000	Rydens Sensation	Jorma Kontio	Stefan Melander	8.16	1:12.7
1999	Beijing Boy	Dan Widegren	Dan Widegren	42.55	1:13.2
1998	Jolly Rocket	Per Lennartsson	Per Lennartsson	1.83	1:13.0
1997	Kramer Boy	Johnny Takter	Johnny Takter	1.79	1:12.1
1996	Regent Broline	Stig H. Johansson	Stig H. Johansson	4.83	1:15.3
1995	Mr Lavec	Jimmy W. Takter	Jimmy W. Takter	5.07	1:12.4
1994	Serena	Christer Nylander	Christer Nylander	3.27	1:13.9
1993	Top Royal	Lennart Forsgren	Lennart Forsgren	4.45	1:13.4
1992	Ciceron Örn	Lars-Ove Lunneryd	Lars-Ove Lunneryd	6.06	1:15.4
1991	First Sid	Björn Linder	Björn Linder	7.65	1:13.5
1990	Drottning Sund	Björn Larsson	Björn Larsson	2.97	1:16.7
1989	Peace On Earth	Stig H. Johansson	Stig H. Johansson	1.54	1:14.6
1988	Gaston Pride	Per-Olof Pettersson	Per-Olof Pettersson	1.70	1:15.7
1987	Ewing Turf	Thomas Uhrberg	Anders Lindqvist	4.35	1:14.8
1986	Alex Pride	Mats Rånlund	Mats Rånlund	5.85	1:14.0
1985	Callit	Karl O. Johansson	Karl O. Johansson	3.19	1:16.4
1984	Anford Bones	Leif Edvinsson	Leif Edvinsson	4.72	1:14.6
1983	The Onion	Stig H. Johansson	Stig H. Johansson	1.74	1:12.0
1982	Speedy Fly	Olle Goop	Arne Bernhardsson	1.87	1:14.1
1981	Ultimo H.	Stig H. Johansson	Stig H. Johansson	9.06	1:15.0
1980	Lepin	Kjell Isgren	Kjell Isgren	2.16	1:16.4
1979	Active Bowler	Jan Nordin	Sören Nordin	4.90	1:16.2
1978	Safari Express	Sven-Erik Landin	Sven-Erik Landin	8.59	1:16.8
1977	Charme Asserdal	Heikki Korpi	Timo Eve	1.24	1:16.8
1976	Gay Frost	Bertil Rogell	Bertil Rogell	2.19	1:18.7
1975	Gotte Takstens	Olle Lindqvist	Olle Lindqvist	9.62	1:17.8
1974	Gallini	Stig H. Johansson	Stig H. Johansson	1.49	1:17.7
1973	Pelle J:r	Karl-Gösta Fylking	Karl-Gösta Fylking	2.84	1:19.1
1972	Lime Rodney	Karl Gustaf Holgersson	Karl Gustaf Holgersson	6.64	1:17.6
1971	Cirro	Sören Nordin	Sören Nordin	2.08	1:19.2

== See also ==
- List of Scandinavian harness horse races
