= 5-year-old European Championship =

- Class: Group One International
- Location: Various European racetracks Europe
- Inaugurated: 1967
- Race type: Harness race for standardbred trotters
- Website: UET - 5 years old European championship

Race information
- Distance: approximately 2,100 meters (1.31 mile)
- Qualification: 5-year-old European-born stallions and mares, selected by national federations that are members of the European Trotting Union
- Purse: ≈US$132,000 (€100,000)

The 5-year-old European Championship, also called European 5-year-old Championship, is an annual Group One harness event that is arranged by the European Trotting Union, UET. The race takes place on a racetrack in one of the member countries of UET. The contenders are chosen by the different national trotting federations that are members of UET. Only 5-year-old European-born stallions and mares can be selected. The 5-year-old European Championship was raced for the first time in 1967.

The 2009 championship was raced at Treviso Racetrack, Italy, on July 26, and had a purse of approximately US$132,000, or €100,000.

== Racing conditions ==
The distance has most years been between 2,000 and 2,300 meters. There are two exceptions. In 1982 and 1986, the distances were 1,600 and 1,660 meters respectively. The distance interval has decreased and since 1990, the race has been over 2,060-2,150 meters. The race has always been started by the use of auto start.

== Past winners ==
=== Drivers with most wins ===
- 2: Eddy Freundt (1967, 1970)
- 2: Stig H. Johansson (1973, 1988)
- 2: Anders Lindqvist (1990, 1995)
- 2: Joseph Verbeeck (1998, 2003)

=== Sires with at least two winning offsprings ===
- 3: Pay Dirt (Tarok, Granit Bangsbo, Hairos)
- 2: Cocktail Jet (Kiwi, Jetstile)
- 2: Express Rodney (Express Gaxe, Ex Lee)

=== Countries, number of wins ===
- 17: Sweden
- 10: France
- 6: Germany
- 3: Denmark
- 3: Norway
- 3: Finland
- 2: Italy
- 1: Netherlands

=== Fastest winners ===
- 1:11.3 (km rate): Mara Bourbon (2005)

=== All winners of the 5-year-old European Championship ===
Year	Horse	Driver	Winning horse's native country	Winning time (km rate)	Track
2011	Joke Face	Lotfi Lolgjini	Sweden	1:12.4	Åby, Sweden
2010	Yield Boko	Bjorn Goop	Sweden	1:12.4	Bjerke, Norway
2009	Ilaria Jet	Jean Michel Bazire	Italy	1:13.9	Treviso, Italy
2008	Brioni	Joakim Lövgren	Germany	1:12.1	Åby, Sweden
2007	Offshore Dream	Henri Levesque	France	1:12.2	Vincennes, France
2006	Jetstile	Geir Vegard Gundersen	Norway	1:13.1	Halmstad, Sweden
2005	Mara Bourbon	Jean-Pierre Dubois	France	1:11.3	Vincennes, France
2004	Tsar d'Inverne	Dominiek Locqueneux	Sweden	1:14.6	Treviso, Italy
2003	Kiwi	Joseph Verbeeck	France	1:13.1	Treviso, Italy
2002	Abano As	Pietro Gubellini	Germany	1:13.7	Treviso, Italy
2001	Zambesi Bi	Mario Biasuzzi	Italy	1:13.8	Treviso, Italy
2000	Varenne	Giampaolo Minnucci	Italy	1:14.5	Treviso, Italy
1999	General du Pommeau	Jules Lepennetier	France	1:16.2	Vincennes, France
1998	Remington Crown	Joseph Verbeeck	Sweden	1:15.1	Vincennes, France
1997	Call Me	Veijo Heiskanen	Finland	1:14.6	Jägersro, Sweden
1996	Defi d'Aunou	Jean-Etienne Dubois	France	1:15.6	Enghien, France
1995	Camino	Anders Lindqvist	France	1:17.3	Bjerke, Norway
1994	Boss Is Back	Jorma Kontio	Finland	1:17.7	Dinslaken, Germany
1993	Iata Käll	Tommy Hanné	Sweden	1:14.6	Gelsenkirchen, Germany
1992	Shan Rags	Noralf Braekken	Norway	1:15.1	Teivo, Finland
1991	Zico Star F.	Asbjörn Mehla	Norway	1:15.1	Daglfing, Germany
1990	Atas Fighter L.	Anders Lindqvist	Sweden	1:16.0	Vincennes, France
1989	Race cancelled due to A2 virus				
1988	Piper Cub	Stig H. Johansson	Sweden	1:16.3	Gelsenkirchen, Germany
1987	Krista Sidney	Olle Goop	Sweden	1:15.9	Axevalla, Sweden
1986	Hairos	John Hansen	Denmark	1:16.4	Cesena, Italy
1985	Granit Bangsbo	Steen Juul	Denmark	1:16.8	Schaasberg, Netherlands
1984	Meadow Sonn	Josef Sparber	Germany	1:17.7	Kuurne, Belgium
1983	Mr Black	Olle Larsson	Sweden	1:16.4	Bjerke, Norway
1982	Dimma	Björn Lindblom	Sweden	1:16.1	Naples, Italy
1981	Dartster F.	Olle Hedin	Sweden	1:17.2	Vincennes, France
1980	Rocky	Martti Ropponen	Finland	1:16.3	Vermo, Finland
1979	Ex Lee	Dan Wegebrand	Sweden	1:19.4	Daglfing, Germany
1978	Express Gaxe	Gunnar Axelryd	Sweden	1:16.6	Tor di Valle, Italy
1977	Tarok	Jörn Laursen	Denmark	1:18.6	Åby, Sweden
1976	Faro	Paul Essartial	France	1:17.0	Duindigt, Netherlands
1975	Micko Tilly	Olle Lindqvist	Sweden	1:18.7	Bjerke, Norway
1974	Dines P.	Michel Lecacheux	France	1:20.4	Vincennes, France
1973	Tim Cross	Stig H. Johansson	Sweden	1:20.0	Sterrebeek, Belgium
1972	Cirro	Sören Nordin	Sweden	1:19.1	Berlin, Germany
1971	Henri Buitenzorg	Jan Wagenaar	Netherlands	1:22.5	Århus, Denmark
1970	Claudia II	Eddy Freundt	Germany	1:19.4	Solvalla, Sweden
1969	Wallburg	W. Root	Germany	1:19.8	Duindigt, Netherlands
1968	Fairland	Bertil Rogell	Sweden	1:21.4	Bjerke, Norway
1967	Sebald	Eddy Freundt	Germany	1:21.9	Gelsenkirchen, Germany
