= Jubileumspokalen =

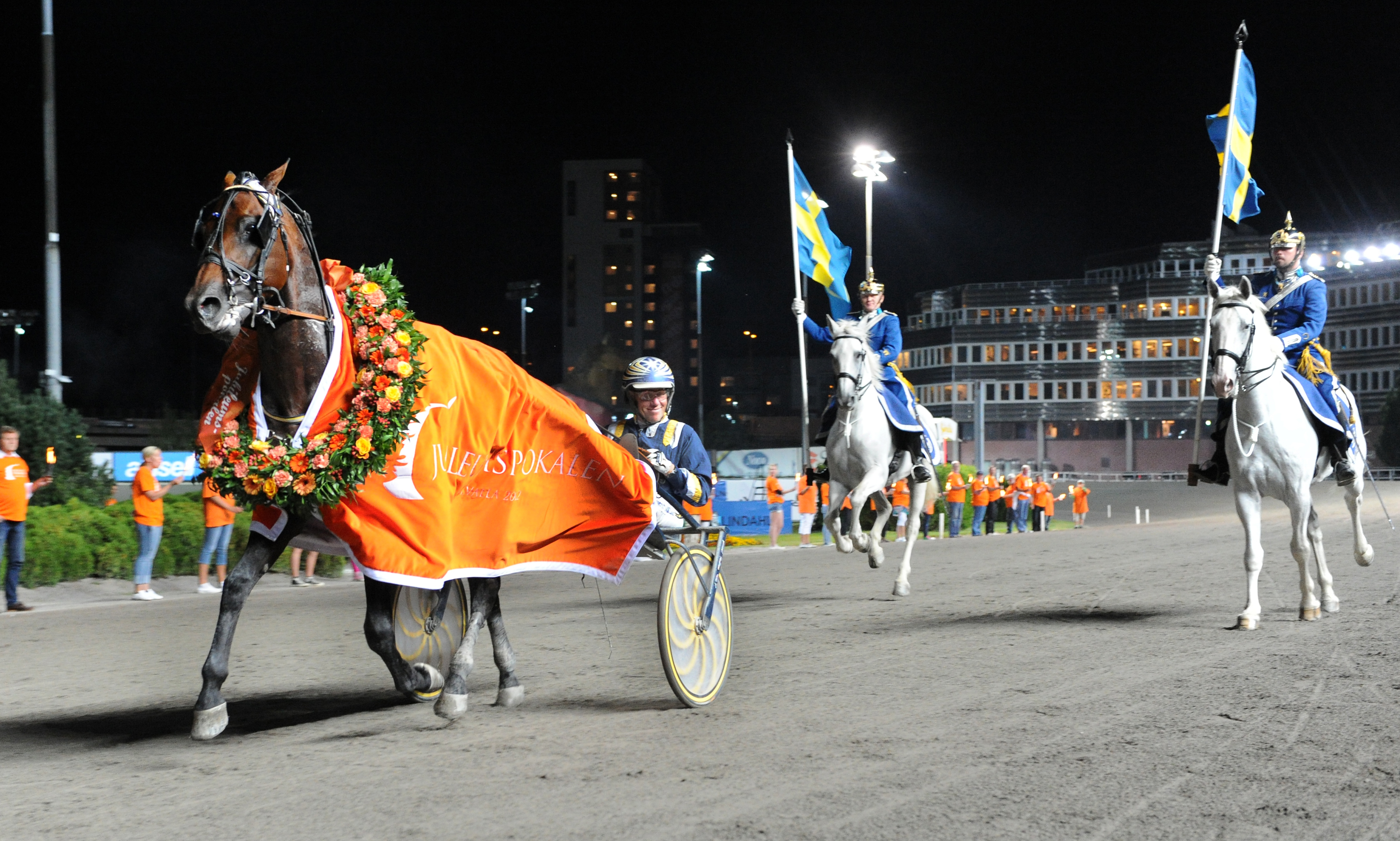
- Friction and Stefan Melander after their victory in 2012.
- Class: Group One International
- Location: Solvalla, Stockholm, Sweden
- Inaugurated: 1977
- Race type: Harness race for standardbred trotters
- Website: Jubileumspokalen (Swedish)

Race information
- Distance: 2,140 meters (1.33 mile)
- Track: Left-handed 1,000 meter track (0.62 mile)
- Qualification: 5-year-olds
- Purse: ≈US$281,000

Jubileumspokalen (literally: The Jubilee Trophy) or Solvallas Jubileumspokal is an annual Group One harness event for trotters that is held at Solvalla in Stockholm, Sweden. Jubileumspokalen has taken place since 1977. In 2008, the purse of the event was approximately US$281,000 (SEK1,750,000).

== Origin ==
In 1977, Solvalla's 50th Anniversary was celebrated. To commemorate this, the new event Jubileumspokalen was inaugurated.

== Racing conditions ==
Since the start in 1977, Jubileumspokalen has been almost exclusively over 2,140 meters (1.33 mile). In the years 1980-1982 however, the race was shorter, 1,640-1,660 meters (1.02-1.03 mile). Auto start has been used every year, with the exception of 1981, when volt start was used.

In January 2009 it was announced that Jubileumspokalen would be somewhat reformed. The 2009 edition will be the first Jubileumspokalen that is open only for 5-year-olds. Prior to 2009, the race was open for horses of age three and up.

== Past winners ==
=== Horses with most wins ===
- 3 - Zoogin (1995, 1996, 1998)
- 3 - Gidde Palema (2003, 2004, 2005)
- 2 - Pershing (1978, 1979)
- 2 - Callit (1986, 1987)
- 2 - Victory Tilly (2000, 2001)

=== Drivers with most wins ===
- 9 - Stig H. Johansson
- 7 - Åke Svanstedt
- 4 - Örjan Kihlström
- 3 - Olle Goop
- 2 - Erik Adielsson
- 2 - Karl O. Johansson
- 2 - Berndt Lindstedt

=== Trainers with most wins ===
- 11 - Stig H. Johansson
- 7 - Åke Svanstedt
- 3 - Stefan Melander
- 2 - Stefan Hultman
- 2 - Karl O. Johansson
- 2 - Berndt Lindstedt

=== Sires with at least two winning offsprings ===
- 2 - Scarlet Knight (Iceland, Friction)
- 2 - Nevele Pride (Pershing, U.S. Thor Viking)
- 2 - Super Bowl (Napoletano, Shogun Lobell)
- 2 - Quick Pay (The Onion, Victory Tilly)
- 2 - Tibur (Callit, Piper Cub)

=== Winner with lowest odds ===
- Winning odds: 1.07 - Pershing (1979)

=== Winner with highest odds ===
- Winning odds: 43.68 - Thai Tanic (2006)

=== Fastest winners ===
==== Auto start ====
- 1:09.9 (km rate) - Readly Express (2017)

==== Volt start ====
- 1:14.7 (km rate) - Zorrino (1981)

=== All winners of Jubileumspokalen ===
Year	Horse	Driver	Trainer	Odds of winner	Winning time (km rate)
2018	Who's Who	Örjan Kihlström	Pasi Aikio	2.06	1:11.1
2018	Makethemark	Ulf Ohlsson	Petri Salmela	3.92	1:10.8
2017	Readly Express	Jorma Kontio	Timo Nurmos	1.80	1:09.9
2016	Nuncio	Örjan Kihlström	Stefan Melander	1.36	1:10.7
2015	Nimbus C.D.	Örjan Kihlström	Stefan Hultman	3.18	1:11,6
2014	Support Justice	Geir Vegard Gundersen	Geir Vegard Gundersen	4.05	1:11.7
2013	Panne de Moteur	Örjan Kihlström	Stefan Hultman	3.88	1:11.6
2012	Friction	Stefan Melander	Stefan Melander	8.13	1:12.1
2011	Prince Tagg	Ralf Karlstedt	Ralf Karlstedt	10.22	1:12.5
2010	Nu Pagadi	Erik Adielsson	Stig H. Johansson	3.55	1:11.6
2009	Iceland	Örjan Kihlström	Stefan Melander	5.68	1:12.9
2008	Finders Keepers	Åke Svanstedt	Åke Svanstedt	2.86	1:12.3
2007	Citation	Erik Adielsson	Stig H. Johansson	4.09	1:12.2
2006	Thai Tanic	Olle Goop	Olle Goop	43.68	1:12.6
2005	Gidde Palema	Åke Svanstedt	Åke Svanstedt	2.72	1:13.0
2004	Gidde Palema	Åke Svanstedt	Åke Svanstedt	2.33	1:12.1
2003	Gidde Palema	Åke Svanstedt	Åke Svanstedt	2.65	1:11.4
2002	Varenne	Giampaolo Minucci	Jori Turja	1.08	1:11.2
2001	Victory Tilly	Stig H. Johansson	Stig H. Johansson	1.88	1:12.9
2000	Victory Tilly	Stig H. Johansson	Stig H. Johansson	1.92	1:11.9
1999	Edu's Speedy	Veijo Heiskanen	Veijo Heiskanen	29.91	1:13.6
1998	Zoogin	Åke Svanstedt	Åke Svanstedt	2.67	1:13.5
1997	Gentle Star	Gunleif Tollefsen	Gunleif Tollefsen	1.57	1:13.1
1996	Zoogin	Åke Svanstedt	Åke Svanstedt	1.46	1:13.2
1995	Zoogin	Åke Svanstedt	Åke Svanstedt	5.59	1:12.7
1994	Bolets Igor	Lennart Forsgren	Bengt-Åke Angel	7.31	1:14.0
1993	Queen L.	Stig H. Johansson	Stig H. Johansson	2.01	1:14.3
1992	To The Gate	Antti Teivanen	Einari Vidgren	5.24	1:13.4
1991	Shogun Lobell	Stig H. Johansson	Stig H. Johansson	1.79	1:14.0
1990	Peace Corps	Stig H. Johansson	Stig H. Johansson	1.28	1:13.4
1989	Napoletano	Stig H. Johansson	Stig H. Johansson	1.14	1:14.5
1988	Piper Cub	Stig H. Johansson	Stig H. Johansson	6.50	1:14.8
1987	Callit	Karl O. Johansson	Karl O. Johansson	2.12	1:14.3
1986	Callit	Karl O. Johansson	Karl O. Johansson	7.06	1:14.2
1985	Minou du Donjon	Olle Goop	Jean-Lou Peupion	5.57	1:13.5
1984	The Onion	Stig H. Johansson	Stig H. Johansson	1.16	1:12.8
1983	Speedy Magnus	Olle Goop	Arne Bernhardsson	8.75	1:14.8
1982	Zorrino	Tommy Hanné	Tommy Hanné	2.14	1:14.7
1981	U.S. Thor Viking	Stig H. Johansson	Stig H. Johansson	7.18	1:15.3
1980	At Risk	Pekka Korpi	Pekka Korpi	1.31	1:15.8
1979	Pershing	Berndt Lindstedt	Berndt Lindstedt	1.07	1:17.0
1978	Pershing	Berndt Lindstedt	Berndt Lindstedt	1.61	1:16.3
1977	Charme Asserdal	Heikki Korpi	Timo Eve	4.26	1:18.7

== See also ==
- List of Scandinavian harness horse races
