= Sundsvall Open Trot =

- Class: Group One International
- Location: Bergsåker Racetrack, Sundsvall, Sweden
- Inaugurated: 1996
- Race type: Harness race for standardbred trotters

Race information
- Distance: 2,140 meters (1.33 mile)
- Track: Left-handed 1,000 meter track (0.62 mile)
- Qualification: Age 3 and up. At least SEK500,001 (≈US$78,000) earned
- Purse: ≈US$273,000

Sundsvall Open Trot is an annual Group One harness event for trotters that is held at Bergsåker Racetrack in Sundsvall, Sweden. Sundsvall Open Trot has taken place since 1996. In 2008, the purse of the event was approximately US$273,000 (SEK1,750,000).

== Racing conditions ==
Every edition of Sundsvall Open Trot has been over 2,140 meters (1.33 mile). The race is started by the use of auto start.

== Past winners ==
=== Horse with most wins ===
- 3 - Victory Tilly (2000, 2001, 2002)

=== Drivers with most wins ===
- 5 - Örjan Kihlström
- 3 - Stig H. Johansson
- 3 - Åke Svanstedt

3 Jerry Riordan===Trainers with most wins===

- 3 - Stig H. Johansson
- 3 - Åke Svanstedt
- 2 - Stefan Melander
- 2 - Stefan Hultman

=== Winner with lowest odds ===
- Winning odds: 1.07 - Victory Tilly (2002)

=== Winner with highest odds ===
- Winning odds: 62.50 - Giant Superman (2007)

=== Fastest winner ===
- 1:10,0 (km rate) - Delicious U.S. (2015)

=== All winners of Sundsvall Open Trot ===
Year	Horse	Driver	Trainer	Odds of winner	Winning time (km rate)
2018	Milligan´s School	Ulf Eriksson	Stefan Melander	20.85	1:10,1
2017	Ringostarr Treb	Wilhelm Paal	Jerry Riordan	6.43	1:11,1
2016	Nuncio	Örjan Kihlström	Stefan Melander	1.32	1:11,7
2015	Delicious U.S.	Örjan Kihlström	Daniel Redén	2.88	1:10,0
2014	Quid Pro Quo	Erik Adielsson	Svante Båthi	14.56	1:11.2
2013	Panne de Moteur	Örjan Kihlström	Stefan Hultman	6.74	1:10,9
2012	Sebastian K.	Åke Svanstedt	Åke Svanstedt	2.38	1:11.6
2011	Joke Face	Erik Adielsson	Lutfi Kolgjini	5.44	1:11.7
2010	Lisa America	Torbjörn Jansson	Jerry Riordan	9.29	1:12.2
2009	Commander Crowe	Peter Ingves	Petri Puro	4.30	1:12.1
2008	Triton Sund	Jörgen Sjunnesson	Stefan Hultman	5.57	1:11.6
2007	Giant Superman	Fredrik B. Larsson	Fredrik B. Larsson	62.50	1:12.7
2006	Giant Diablo	Örjan Kihlström	Roger Walmann	10.39	1:12.5
2005	Spring Ray	Björn Goop	Håkan Olofsson	6.77	1:12.7
2004	Infant du Bossis	Örjan Kihlström	Stefan Melander	5.49	1:12.0
2003	Gidde Palema	Åke Svanstedt	Åke Svanstedt	1.23	1:13.5
2002	Victory Tilly	Stig H. Johansson	Stig H. Johansson	1.07	1:12.1
2001	Victory Tilly	Stig H. Johansson	Stig H. Johansson	1.27	1:12.2
2000	Victory Tilly	Stig H. Johansson	Stig H. Johansson	1.92	1:12.7
1999	Remington Crown	Joseph Verbeeck	Jan Kruithof	2.65	1:13.0
1998	Zoogin	Åke Svanstedt	Åke Svanstedt	1.72	1:14.6
1997	Scandal Play	Bo Eklöf	Lars Marklund	9.13	1:13.5
1996	His Majesty	Torbjörn Jansson	Annelie Henriksson	9.12	1:13.6

== See also ==
- List of Scandinavian harness horse races
