= Gran Premio Lotteria =

Coordinates: 40°50′09″N 14°10′23″E

- Class: Group One International
- Location: Agnano Racetrack, Naples, Italy
- Inaugurated: 1951
- Race type: Harness race for standardbred trotters

Race information
- Distance: 1,600 meters (0.99 mile)
- Track: Left-handed 1,000 meter track (0.62 mile)
- Qualification: Age 4 and up
- Purse: ≈US$795,000 (€600,600)

Gran Premio Lotteria, or Gran Premio della Lotteria, or in short, Lotteria, is an annual Group One harness event that takes place at Agnano Racetrack in Naples, Italy. The competition, which was inaugurated in 1951, is regarded as one of the most prestigious international events in trotting. The winner is decided through three qualifying heats and a subsequent final later the same day. Both the eliminations and the final are raced over 1,600 meters. Gran Premio Lotteria is part of the European Grand Circuit and the overall purse for the 2009 event was €600,600, equalling approximately US$795,000. The fastest winning time in the history of the race is 1:10.5, run by Timone Ek in 2017.

== Racing conditions ==
=== The races ===
Gran Premio Lotteria is decided through three elimination heats, followed by a final. The first three trotters of each elimination progress to the final, which is run later the same day. There is also a consolations race for the competitors that do not succeed in qualifying for the final.

=== Distance and starting method ===
The distance was, during the first seven years, 1,700 meters. This was shortened to 1,680 meters in 1959. In 1976 the distance was further decreased, to today's 1,600 meters. With the exceptions of 1951, 1952 and 1956, the race have always been started by the use of auto start.

== The 2009 Lotteria ==
=== The starting list (the final) ===
1. Algiers Hall - Roberto Vecchione (Holger Ehlert)
2. Opal Viking - Björn Goop (Nils Enqvist)
3. Oiseau de Feux - Jean-Michel Bazire (Fabrice Souloy)
4. Island Effe - Pietro Gubellini (Edoardo Gubellini)
5. Jodas Julia - Dominiek Locqueneux (Catarina Lundström)
6. Ghibellino - Roberto Andreghetti (Eric Bondo)
7. Idalgo Jet - Pasquale Esposito J:r (Ottavio Silvestri)
8. Classic Grand Cru - Thomas Uhrberg (Steen Juul)
9. Ismos Fp - Enrico Bellei (Claus Ernst Hollman)

Swedish stallion Opal Viking, trained by Nils Enqvist and driven by Björn Goop, was betting favourite, followed by Oiseau de Feux, Algiers Hall and Ghibellino.

=== The race ===
Algiers Hall went to the front and driver Roberto Vecchione chose to keep the lead when favourite Opal Viking announced an interest to take it over. Oiseau de Feux followed as third and the pace was very slow. In the stretch, Island Effe and Ghibellino came from behind to claim the first and second place, respectively. Oiseau de Feux overtook Opal Viking to reach third, while the Swedish favourite finished fourth.

Island Effe became the first Italian mare to win the event. The winning time for the Italian 5-year-old mare after Lemon Dra, was 1:57.1 (mile rate)/1:12.9 (km rate). The winner's purse was US$275,000.

== Past winners ==
=== Horses with most wins ===
- 3 - Birbone (1952, 1953, 1955)
- 3 - Tornese (1957, 1958, 1962)
- 3 - Une de Mai (1969, 1970, 1971)
- 3 - Varenne (2000, 2001, 2002)
- 2 - The Last Hurrah (1978, 1979)

=== Drivers with most wins ===
- 5 - Vivaldo Baldi (1952, 1953, 1955, 1978, 1979)
- 5 - Jean-Rene Gougeon (1967, 1969, 1970, 1971, 1976)
- 4 - Stig H. Johansson (1984, 1991, 2003, 2005)
- 4 - Roberto Andreghetti (2012, 2013, 2014, 2015)
- 3 - Sergio Brighenti (1958, 1962, 1963)
- 3 - Giampaolo Minnucci (2000, 2001, 2002)

=== Trainers with most wins ===
- 5 - Vivaldo Baldi (1952, 1953, 1955, 1978, 1979)
- 5 - Jean-Rene Gougeon (1967, 1969, 1970, 1971, 1976)
- 4 - Sergio Brighenti (1957, 1958, 1962, 1963)
- 4 - Stig H. Johansson (1984, 1991, 2003, 2005)
- 3 - Jori Turja (2000, 2001, 2002)

=== Sires with at least two winning offsprings ===
- 3 - Nevele Pride (Contingent Fee, Evita Broline, Classy Rogue)
- 2 - Ayres (Top Hanover, The Last Hurrah)
- 2 - Pharaon (Tornese, Nievo)
- 2 - Quick Pay (The Onion, Victory Tilly)
- 2 - Speedy Crown (Evann C., Embassy Lobell)

=== Fastest winners ===
==== Auto start ====
- 1:10.8 (km rate) - Varenne (2002)

==== Volt start (1951, 1952, 1956) ====
- 1:17.8 (km rate) - Gelinotte (1956)

=== All winners of Gran Premio Lotteria ===
Year	Horse	Driver	Trainer	Winning horse's native country	Winning time
2020	Zacon Gio	Roberto Vecchione	Holger Ehlert	Italy	1:10.5
2019	Bel Avis	Jean Michel Bazire	Jean Michel Bazire	France	1:11.3
2018	Urlo dei Venti	Enrico Bellei	Gennaro Casillio	Italy	1:10.8
2017	Timone Ek	Enrico Bellei	Philippe Billard	Italy	1:10.5
2016	Oasis Bi	Johnny Takter	Stefan P.Pettersson	Italy	1:10.7
2015	Vincennes	Roberto Andreghetti	Fabrice Souloy	France	1:11.8
2014	Mack Grace Sm	Roberto Andreghetti	Antonio Porzio	Italy	1:11.1
2013	Mack Grace Sm	Roberto Andreghetti	Lucio Colletti	Italy	1:11.3
2012	Mack Grace Sm	Roberto Andreghetti	Lucio Colletti	Italy	1:11.8
2011	Libeccio Grif	Marco Smorgon	Marco Smorgon	Italy	1:12.8
2010	Italiano	Gaetano Di Nardo	Enrico Bellei	Italy	1:11.3
2009	Island Effe	Pietro Gubellini	Edoardo Gubellini	Italy	1:12.9
2008	Gambling Bi	Jean-Michel Bazire	Fabrice Souloy	Italy	1:11.3
2007	Exploit Caf	Jean-Michel Bazire	Fabrice Souloy	Italy	1:12.0
2006	Malabar Circle Ås	Andrea Guzzinati	Jerry Riordan	Sweden	1:12.1
2005	Digger Crown	Stig H. Johansson	Stig H. Johansson	Sweden	1:13.0
2004	Legendary Lover K.	Enrico Bellei	Gunnar Christiansen	United States	1:12.5
2003	Victory Tilly	Stig H. Johansson	Stig H. Johansson	Sweden	1:12.7
2002	Varenne	Giampaolo Minucci	Jori Turja	Italy	1:10.8
2001	Varenne	Giampaolo Minucci	Jori Turja	Italy	1:12.6
2000	Varenne	Giampaolo Minucci	Jori Turja	Italy	1:12.4
1999	Remington Crown	Joseph Verbeeck	Jan Kruithof	Sweden	1:11.1
1998	Kramer Boy	Johnny Takter	Johnny Takter	Sweden	1:14.1
1997	Wesgate Crown	Enrico Bellei	Raz Mackenzie	United States	1:12.4
1996	Crowning Classic	Mauro Baroncini	Mauro Baroncini	United States	1:12.4
1995	Ina Scot	Helen A. Johansson	Kjell P. Dahlström	Sweden	1:13.1
1994	Uconn Don	Andrea Baveresi	Andrea Baveresi	United States	1:13.7
1993	Embassy Lobell	Wim Paal	Wim Paal	United States	1:12.8
1992	Bravur Sund	Mauro Baroncini	Mauro Baroncini	Sweden	1:12.7
1991	Peace Corps	Stig H. Johansson	Stig H. Johansson	United States	1:14.0
1990	Evann C.	Björn Lindblom	Björn Lindblom	United States	1:12.9
1989	Hollyhurst	Lorenzo Baldi	Lorenzo Baldi	United States	1:13.2
1988	Grades Singing	Olle Goop	Olle Goop	United States	1:12.8
1987	Limbo Joe	Vittorio Guzzinati	Vittorio Guzzinati	United States	1:13.9
1986	Classy Rogue	William Casoli	William Casoli	United States	1:14.8
1985	Evita Broline	Berndt Lindstedt	Berndt Lindstedt	Sweden	1:13.9
1984	The Onion	Stig H. Johansson	Stig H. Johansson	Sweden	1:14.1
1983	Keystone Patriot	Veijo Heiskanen	Antti Savolainen	United States	1:15.6
1982	Our Dream of Mite	Eduardo Gubellini	Eduardo Gubellini	United States	1:14.7
1981	Contingent Fee	Mario Rivara	Mario Rivara	United States	1:16.2
1980	Hillion Brillouard	Philippe Allaire	Philippe Allaire	France	1:13.8
1979	The Last Hurrah	Vivaldo Baldi	Vivaldo Baldi	United States	1:14.9
1978	The Last Hurrah	Vivaldo Baldi	Vivaldo Baldi	United States	1:14.5
1977	Wayne Eden	Anselmo Fontanesi	Anselmo Fontanesi	United States	1:14.7
1976	Bellino II	Jean-Rene Gougeon	Jean-Rene Gougeon	France	1:15.2
1975	Dimitria	Leopold Verroken	Leopold Verroken	France	1:16.1
1974	Top Hanover	Gerhard Krüger	Gerhard Krüger	United States	1:17.7
1973	Lightning Larry	Eduardo Gubellini	Eduardo Gubellini	United States	1:16.5
1972	Amyot	Louis Sauvé	Louis Sauvé	France	1:16.8
1971	Une de Mai	Jean-Rene Gougeon	Jean-Rene Gougeon	France	1:16.7
1970	Une de Mai	Jean-Rene Gougeon	Jean-Rene Gougeon	France	1:16.6
1969	Une de Mai	Jean-Rene Gougeon	Jean-Rene Gougeon	France	1:16.6
1968	Eileen Eden	Johannes Frömming	Johannes Frömming	United States	1:16.5
1967	Roquepine	Jean-Rene Gougeon	Henri Levesque	France	1:16.4
1966	Cheer Honey	Gerhard Krüger	Gerhard Krüger	United States	1:16.7
1965	Elma	Johannes Frömming	Jonel Chyriacos	France	1:16.5
1964	Hurst Hanover	Giancarlo Baldi	Giancarlo Baldi	United States	1:16.7
1963	Behave	Sergio Brighenti	Sergio Brighenti	United States	1:16.4
1962	Tornese	Sergio Brighenti	Sergio Brighenti	Italy	1:16.8
1961	Kracovie	Roger Vercruysse	Roger Vercruysse	France	1:17.0
1960	Nievo	Ugo Bottoni	Ugo Bottoni	Italy	1:17.5
1959	Icare IV	Walter Baroncini	Walter Baroncini	France	1:16.7
1958	Tornese	Sergio Brighenti	Sergio Brighenti	Italy	1:17.9
1957	Tornese	Mario Santi	Sergio Brighenti	Italy	1:18.5
1956	Gelinotte	Charlie Mills	Charlie Mills	France	1:17.8
1955	Birbone	Vivaldo Baldi	Vivaldo Baldi	Italy	1:18.6
1954	Saint Clair	Oduardo Baldi	Oduardo Baldi	United States	1:19.4
1953	Birbone	Vivaldo Baldi	Vivaldo Baldi	Italy	1:18.5
1952	Birbone	Vivaldo Baldi	Vivaldo Baldi	Italy	1:18.6
1951	Bayard	Ugo Bottoni	Ugo Bottoni	Italy	1:20.3
