= Stig H. Johansson =

Swedish horse trainer and driver (born 1945)

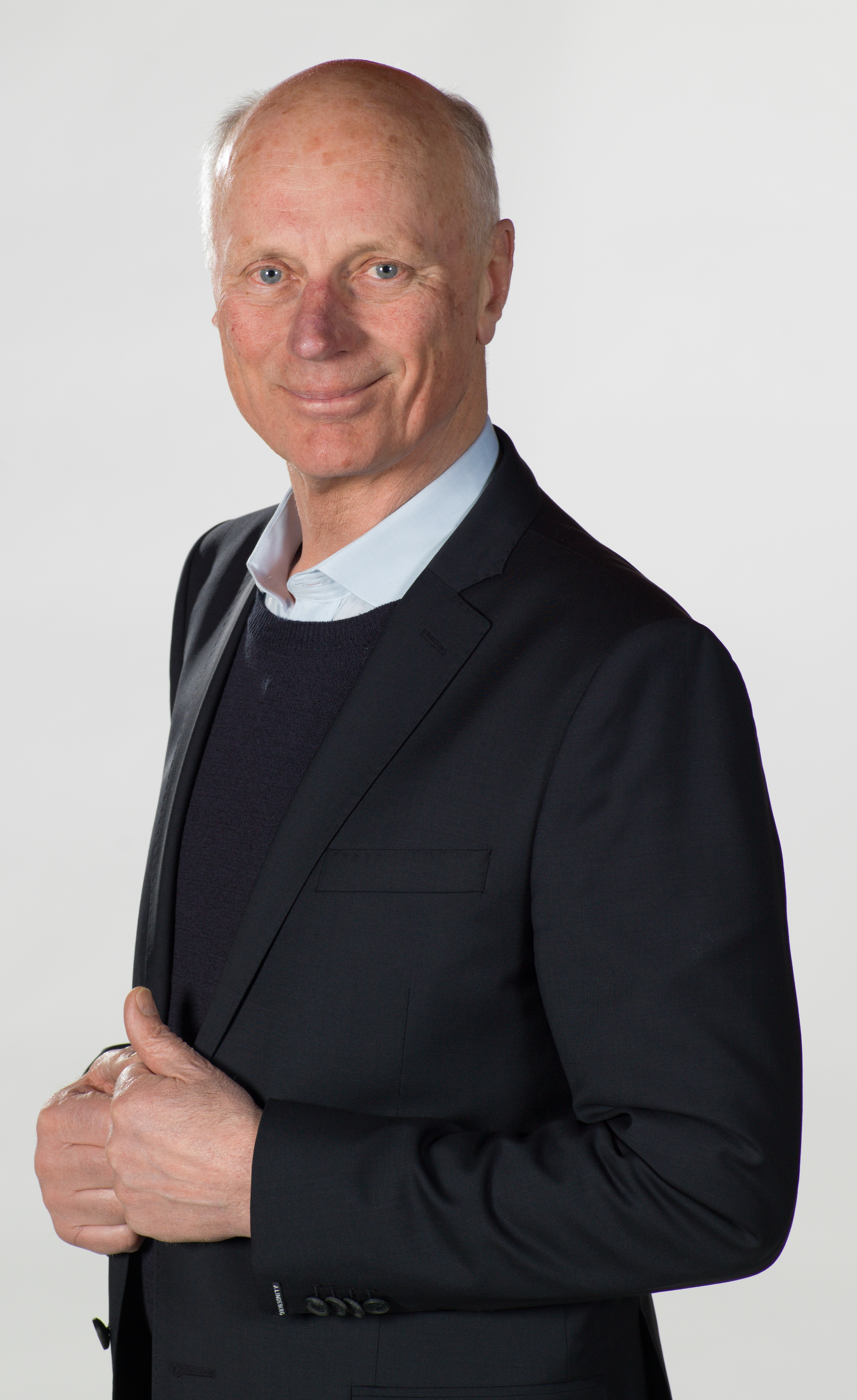
- Stig H. Johansson in March 2015

Personal information
- Born: 26 July 1945 (age 81) Forsa, Hälsingland, Sweden
- Occupations: Trainer, former driver

Horse racing career
- Sport: Horse racing
- Career wins: More than 7,000 as a trainer, 6,222 as a driver

Major racing wins
- * indicates win as trainer only ** indicates win as driver only: Breeders Crown (Sweden) (1992*, 1996**, 1996**, 1999, 2000, 2001, 2004, 2008*, 2008*); Drottning Silvias Pokal (Sweden) (1988, 1991, 2006*); Elitloppet (Sweden) (1984, 1987, 1989, 1991, 1997, 2000); Hugo Åbergs Memorial (Sweden) (1977, 1982, 1984, 1990, 1991, 1992, 2000, 2006*); Konung Gustaf V:s Pokal (Sweden) (1981, 1984, 1993, 1994, 2000, 2009*); Olympiatravet (Sweden) (1986, 1993, 1994); Jubileumspokalen (Sweden) (1981, 1984, 1988, 1989, 1990, 1991, 1993, 2000, 2001, 2007*, 2010*); Sprintermästaren (Sweden) (1974, 1981, 1983, 1989, 1996, 2007*); Stochampionatet (Sweden) (1977, 1981, 1988, 1990, 1991, 1995, 2003); Svensk Uppfödningslöpning (Sweden) (1978, 1983, 1990); Swedish Championship (Sweden) (1975, 1977, 1988, 1989, 1991, 1993, 1994, 1999); Swedish Trotting Criterium (Sweden) (1973, 1984, 1986, 1990, 1991); Swedish Trotting Derby (Sweden) (1970, 1974, 1982, 1984, 1990, 1999, 2000); Åby Stora Pris (Sweden) (1984, 1986, 1993, 2000, 2002); Copenhagen Cup (Denmark) (2000, 2001); Finlandia Ajo (Finland) (1988, 1989, 2004); Forus Open (Norway) (2006*); Oslo Grand Prix (Norway) (1991, 2000); Breeders Crown (Germany) (2006*, 2007*); Elite-Rennen (Germany) (1991*, 1999); Preis der Besten (Germany) (1993); Grote Prijs der Giganten (Netherlands) (1983); Grand Critérium de Vitesse de la Côte d'Azur (France) (1997); Prix d'Amérique (France) (1993); Prix de Belgique (France) (1993, 1994); Prix de France (1995); Prix de Paris (France) (1990); Campionato Europeo (Italy) (2003); Gran Premio Citta' di Montecatini (Italy) (1997); Gran Premio Costa Azzurra (Italy) (1985, 1991); Gran Premio della Lotteria (Italy) (1984, 1991, 2003, 2005); Gran Premio Delle Nazioni (Italy) (1990, 1992*, 2001*, 2002, 2004); Gran Premio Duomo (Italy) (1986, 1995, 2004); Gran Premio Renzo Orlandi (Italy) (1991); Gran Premio Gaetano Turilli (Italy) (2001); Gran Premio U.N.I.R.E. (Italy) (1986, 1988); European 5-year-old Championship (Europe) (1988); Grand Prix de l'UET (Europe) (1985, 1986, 1988, 2001); Breeders Crown (United States) (1990, 1994); Nat Ray Trot (United States) (2002)

Racing awards
- Trainer of the Year (Sweden) (1990, 1991, 1992, 1993, 1994, 1995, 2000, 2005); Driver of the Year (Sweden) (2000)

Honours
- Trotting Hall of Fame (Sweden) (inducted in 2008)

Significant horses
- Victory Tilly, Queen L., Peace Corps, Napoletano; Digger Crown, The Onion, Utah Bulwark
- Updated on 9 June 2008

Stig Henry Johansson (born 26 July 1945 in Forsa, Hälsingland, Sweden) is a Swedish trotting trainer and former driver. He started his career as a professional trainer in 1969, and has during a large part of the career been a dominating force in Swedish trotting. He is, arguably, the greatest in Swedish trotting history. Internationally, he is regarded as one of the sport's greats. Among the horses he has trained are top trotters Victory Tilly, Queen L., Peace Corps, Napoletano, Digger Crown, The Onion and Utah Bulwark. Together with these and other horses, Johansson has won numerous major races, including Elitloppet (six times), Gran Premio della Lotteria (four times), Nat Ray Trot (once) and Prix d'Amérique (once).

In December 2005, Johansson announced his decision to quit driving races, but to continue train trotters. The same evening, he drove his last race. He won 6,222 races during 42 years as a driver.

Johansson has won more than 7,000 races as a trainer, second most in Swedish trotting history behind Olle Goop. In December 2008, Johansson passed SEK700 million (~US$87.1 million) won as a trainer.
