= Pekka Korpi =

Finnish harness racing trainer and driver

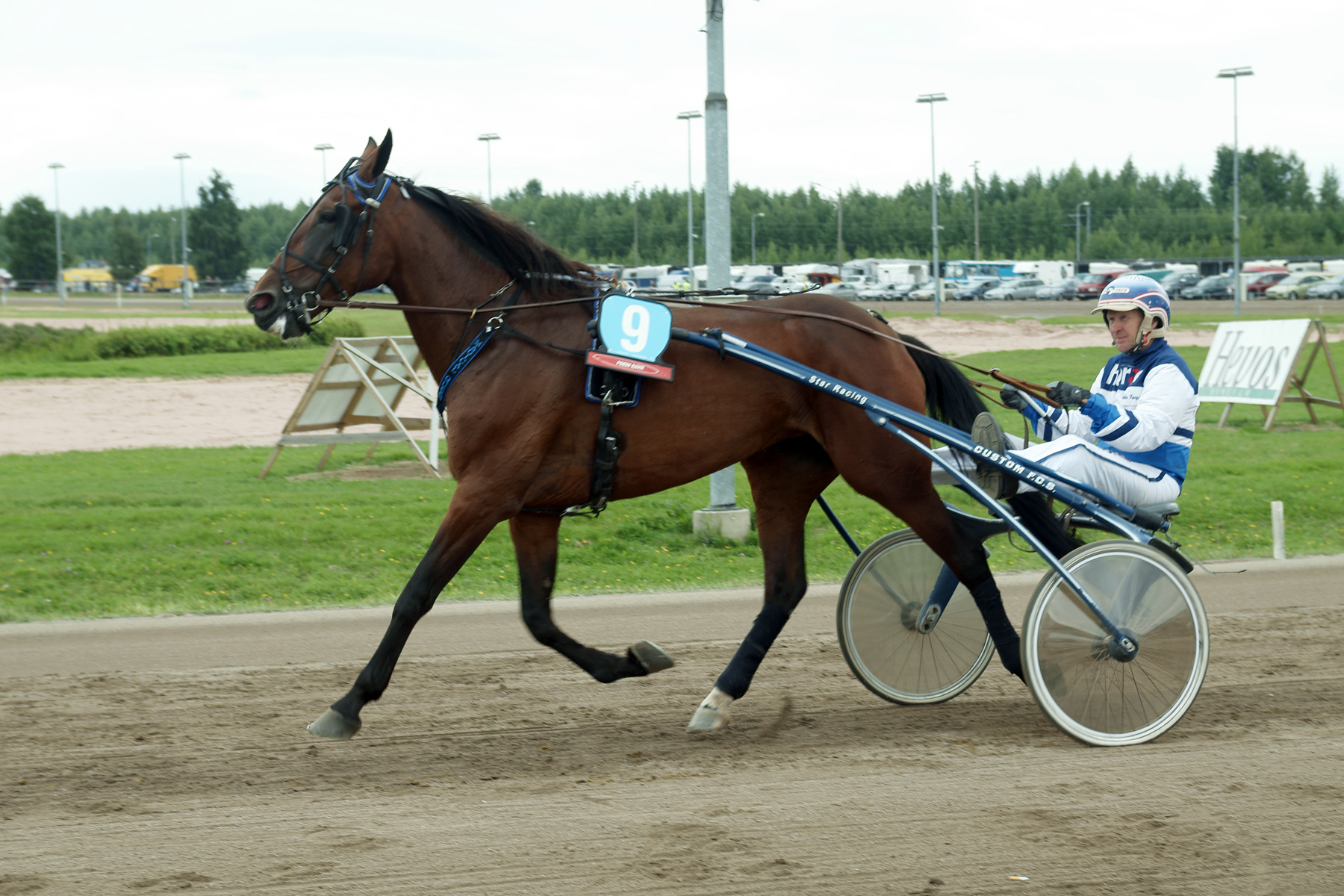
Pekka Korpi and Magical Queen at Pori race track, 2011

Pekka Korpi (born 11 November 1949 in Oulu) is a Finnish harness racing trainer and driver. With more than 5 000 wins he is one of the most successful harness drivers in Scandinavia. Since 2011 Korpi has been training and driving mostly in Sweden. During the 1980s he also worked several years in the United States and in Belgium.

Pekka Korpi's son Janne Korpi is an olympic snowboarder.

== Sources ==
- Pekka Korpi at Finnish National Horse Breeding Association's pages (In Finnish)
