= Swedish Trotting Criterium =

Swedish Trotting Criterium Svenskt Travkriterium
- Class: Group One National
- Location: Solvalla, Stockholm, Sweden
- Inaugurated: 1927
- Race type: Harness race for standardbred trotters

Race information
- Distance: 2,640 meters (1.64 miles)
- Track: Left-handed 1,000 meter track (0.62 mile)
- Qualification: Swedish 3-year-olds
- Purse: ≈US$458,000

The Swedish Trotting Criterium (Swedish: Svenskt Travkriterium or only Kriteriet) is an annual national Group One harness event for trotters that is held at Solvalla in Stockholm, Sweden. It is considered one of the classic trotting events in Sweden as well as the most prestigious Swedish event for 3-year-old trotters. The purse in the 2008 final was ≈US$458,000 (SEK 3,200,000), of which the winner Maharajah won half.

== Location ==
The Swedish Trotting Criterium has been exclusively held at Solvalla since 1966. The first five editions was raced at Jägersro, before the hostesship was altered between Solvalla and Jägersro until 1954, when Åby was added to the mix. The three tracks took turns until 1966, just as with the Swedish Trotting Derby, another prestigious Swedish event. In 1966, Solvalla started to host the Criterium annually and Jägersro became permanent host track of the Derby.

- 1927 - 1931 Jägersro
- 1932 - 1954 Solvalla or Jägersro
- 1954 - 1965 Åby, Solvalla or Jägersro
- 1966 - Solvalla

== Entering the event ==
To enter the Swedish Trotting Criterium, a horse owner is obliged to make four payments of totally ≈US$530 (SEK4,125) as of 2009. These payments are as well valid for the Swedish Trotting Oaks, which is held at the same day as the Criterium but are open only for fillies. In addition to these costs, a supplementary fee of ≈US$820 (SEK6,360) is paid to enter the elimination races before the final. If a filly owner decides to enter the Oaks instead of the Criterium, the supplementary fee is half as large, ≈US$410 (SEK3,180).

== Racing conditions ==
=== Distance ===
From the start in 1927 until 1977, the distance of the Criterium was 2,600 meters (1.62 miles). In 1978, an added 40 meters made up a distance of 2,640 meters (1.64 miles), which has been the distance of the race ever since.

=== Starting method ===
The first 33 Criterium finals was started by using volt start. In 1960, auto start was introduced. Since then, a motorized starting gate has been used every year, with exceptions for 1967, 1971 and 1979.

== Past winners ==
=== Drivers with most wins ===
- 8 - Gunnar Nordin
- 8 - Sören Nordin
- 5 - Stig H. Johansson
- 5 - Örjan Kihlström
- 4 - Gösta Nordin
- 3 - Håkan Wallner
- 3 - Robert Bergh

=== Trainers with most wins ===
- 8 - Gunnar Nordin
- 8 - Sören Nordin
- 5 - Stig H. Johansson
- 4 - Gösta Nordin
- 4 - Olle Goop
- 3 - Håkan Wallner
- 3 - Robert Bergh
- 3 - Stefan Hultman

=== Sires with at least two winning offsprings ===
- 3 - Quick Pay (Ex Hammering, Lass Quick, Lucky Po)
- 2 - Allen Hanover (Allen Victory, Ina Scot)
- 2 - Bulwark (Sir Basil, J'accuse)
- 2 - Dreamer Boy (Ibrahim Pascha, Karina S.)
- 2 - Express Ride (Jaded, Sahara Dynamite)
- 2 - Jaguar (Sang, Coccinelle)
- 2 - Locomotive (Codex, Locomite)
- 2 - Pershing (Mack the Knife, Personia)
- 2 - Pluvier III (Oktan Sund, Pamir Brodde)
- 2 - Rollo (Julienne, Gay Gal)
- 2 - Sir Walter Scott (Walter Top, Löjtnant Scott)
- 2 - Zoot Suit (Zoogin, From Above)

=== Mares with at least two winning offsprings ===
- 2 - Lemomite (Lord Scotch, Lime Abbey)

=== Winning stallions that have also sired winners ===
- Active Bowler (1978), sire of Not So Bad (1989)

=== Winning mares that have also brood winners ===
- Lorry (1932), dam of Turf (1944)

=== Winner with lowest odds ===
- Winning odds: 1.16 - Julienne (1961)

=== Winner with highest odds ===
- Winning odds: 119.00 - Kerrim (1957)

=== Fastest winners ===
==== Auto start ====
- 1:14.0 (km rate) - Maharajah (2008)

==== Volt start ====
- 1:18.5 (km rate) - Pamir Brodde (1979)

=== All winners of the Swedish Trotting Criterium ===
Year	Horse	Driver	Trainer	Odds of winner	Winning time (km rate)
2008	Maharajah	Örjan Kihlström	Stefan Hultman	1.50	1:14.0
2007	Sahara Dynamite	Örjan Kihlström	Timo Nurmos	1.64	1:15.0
2006	Marquis de Pommeau	Örjan Kihlström	Timo Nurmos	9.25	1:14.8
2005	Jaded	Örjan Kihlström	Stefan Hultman	5.45	1:16.6
2004	Conny Nobell	Björn Goop	Björn Goop	1.84	1:15.2
2003	Nolte	Olle Goop	Olle Goop	9.87	1:16.1
2002	Malabar Circle Ås	Torbjörn Jansson	Svante Båth	3.03	1:15.2
2001	From Above	Örjan Kihlström	Stefan Hultman	9.30	1:15.8
2000	Hilda Zonett	Robert Bergh	Robert Bergh	4.87	1:15.2
1999	Simb Zipper	Robert Bergh	Robert Bergh	3.11	1:15.2
1998	Lucky Po	Stefan Melander	Stefan Melander	22.35	1:16.9
1997	Sans Peur	Björn Goop	Olle Goop	12.78	1:16.8
1996	Remington Crown	Robert Bergh	Robert Bergh	14.33	1:16.3
1995	Drewgi	Åke Svanstedt	Tommy K. Jansson	5.96	1:16.6
1994	Mr. Lavec	Jimmy Takter	Jimmy Takter	1.48	1:17.0
1993	Zoogin	Åke Svanstedt	Åke Svanstedt	20.22	1:16.3
1992	Ina Scot	Kjell P. Dahlström	Kjell P. Dahlström	1.60	1:16.4
1991	Pont Neuf	Stig H. Johansson	Stig H. Johansson	6.51	1:16.8
1990	Union Shark	Stig H. Johansson	Stig H. Johansson	1.38	1:17.8
1989	Not So Bad	Lennart Forsgren	Olle Goop	13.06	1:18.8
1988	Allen Victory	Tommy Hanné	Tommy Hanné	28.39	1:18.0
1987	Carolo Min	Krister Söderholm	Ove Sjöström	10.04	1:16.8
1986	Piper Cub	Stig H. Johansson	Stig H. Johansson	4.46	1:16.7
1985	Personia	Björn Linder	Björn Linder	35.12	1:16.9
1984	Mack the Knife	Stig H. Johansson	Stig H. Johansson	5.32	1:17.9
1983	Lass Quick	Heikki Korpi	Heikki Korpi	2.28	1:16.3
1982	Ex Hammering	Ulf Nordin	Ulf Nordin	5.45	1:18.2
1981	Happy Feeling	Karl-Erik Nilsson	Ronny Gustafsson	14.22	1:20.6
1980	Micado C.	Ulf Nordin	Ulf Nordin	6.51	1:19.0
1979	Pamir Brodde	Karl-Erik Nilsson	Karl-Erik Nilsson	2.01	1:18.5
1978	Active Bowler	Sören Nordin	Sören Nordin	4.52	1:19.3
1977	Oktan Sund	Berndt Lindstedt	Berndt Lindstedt	3.07	1:23.9
1976	Lord Rappe	Olle Goop	Olle Goop	4.12	1:22.2
1975	Top Fläkt	Håkan Wallner	Håkan Wallner	36.67	1:20.5
1974	Thomas R. N.	Jan Ödquist	Jan Ödquist	2.97	1:22.6
1973	Grain	Stig H. Johansson	Stig H. Johansson	1.97	1:19.9
1972	Desert Air	Sören Nordin	Sören Nordin	1.79	1:20.9
1971	Idé Sund	Gunnar Nordin	Gunnar Nordin	8.29	1:22.6
1970	G. A. Scotch	Sören Nordin	Sören Nordin	2.61	1:22.7
1969	Boett	Per Sundberg	Per Sundberg	3.87	1:21.5
1968	Zolomit	Sören Nordin	Sören Nordin	1.72	1:22.8
1967	Rikitikitavi	Gunnar Nordin	Gunnar Nordin	1.60	1:23.8
1966	Monolog	Håkan Wallner	Håkan Wallner	8.78	1:22.2
1965	Ibs	Håkan Wallner	Håkan Wallner	2.73	1:23.9
1964	Mignon	Gunnar Nordin	Gunnar Nordin	12.09	1:22.7
1963	Coccinelle	Nils Sundin	Nils Sundin	3.17	1:23.7
1962	Gay Gal	Berndt Lindstedt	Berndt Lindstedt	12.28	1:22.6
1961	Julienne	Sören Nordin	Sören Nordin	1.16	1:23.5
1960	Amit H.	Nils Sundin	Nils Sundin	1.44	1:23.4
1959	Clementz	Sören Nordin	Sören Nordin	1.37	1:25.5
1958	Locomite	Gunnar Nordin	Gunnar Nordin	6.19	1:24.2
1957	Kerrim	Bengt Andersson	Bengt Andersson	119.00	1:25.9
1956	Noon Bull	Gunnar Nordin	Gunnar Nordin	3.72	1:24.0
1955	Sang	Kurt Mattsson	Kurt Mattsson	3.66	1:27.7
1954	Lord Scotch	Sören Nordin	Sören Nordin	2.41	1:24.2
1953	Codex	Sören Nordin	Sören Nordin	1.52	1:26.8
1952	Gay Noon	Gunnar Nordin	Gunnar Nordin	6.86	1:24.7
1951	J'accuse	Gunnar Nordin	Gunnar Nordin	3.10	1:26.4
1950	Sir Basil	Gösta Nordin	Gösta Nordin	2.80	1:26.3
1949	Löjtnant Scott	Carl A. Schoug	Carl A. Schoug	6.17	1:25.3
1948	Toreador	Erik Larsson	Erik Larsson	2.92	1:26.2
1947	Ivan	Hugo Andersson	Hugo Andersson	8.69	1:30.5
1946	Jagilon	Gunnar Nordin	Gunnar Nordin	1.22	1:26.1
1945	Excellens Will	Owe Nilsson	Owe Nilsson	1.47	1:28.1
1944	Turf	Gösta Nordin	Gösta Nordin	1.60	1:27.5
1943	Bess Brodde	Hans Ringström	Hans Ringström	2.20	1:26.9
1942	Lime Abbey	Gösta Nordin	Gösta Nordin	1.42	1:26.0
1941	Walter Top	Ragnar Thorngren	Ragnar Thorngren	3.61	1:27.6
1940	Skottlandshus	Owe Nilsson	Owe Nilsson	5.13	1:28.8
1939	Mac the Great	Eric Carlsson	Eric Carlsson	3.55	1:27.0
1938	Queen Nedworthy	Antonius Adamski	Antonius Adamski	1.29	1:27.5
1937	Mary Louise	Gösta Nordin	Gösta Nordin	1.29	1:27.5
1936	Sete	Göte Nilsson	Göte Nilsson	2.36	1:31.2
1935	Kickan	Anton Fyhr	Anton Fyhr	1.88	1:30.1
1934	The Senator Indiana	Carl Holmström	Carl Holmström	1.32	1:31.8
1933	Etta June	Gotthard Ericsson	Gotthard Ericsson	1.77	1:31.9
1932	Lorry	Sixten Lundgren	Sixten Lundgren	1.66	1:34.6
1931	Blå Bird	Johan Jacobsson	Johan Jacobsson	2.35	1:36.5
1930	Peter Spjuver	Anton Fyhr	Anton Fyhr	1.47	1:41.9
1929	Ruter Dam	Anders Nilsson	Anders Nilsson	1.22	1:41.2
1928	Karina S.	Sophus Sörensen	Sophus Sörensen	1.77	1:35.9
1927	Ibrahim Pascha	Sophus Sörensen	Sophus Sörensen	1.59	1:34.6

== See also ==
- List of Scandinavian harness horse races
