= Harness racing in Sweden =

Overview of trotting sport practiced in Sweden

Harness racing (also known as trotting), is a popular sport in Sweden, with significant amounts of money wagered annually. In Sweden there are 33 harness racing tracks, which hold over 850 meetings annually. There are approximately 3,000 drivers and 6,000 trainers with about 18,000 horses in training.

Betting on horse racing is common in Sweden, the Swedish Horse Racing Totalisator Board being the second-biggest betting company there.

== Racing ==
Harness racing in Sweden is conducted with Standardbred or, in some races Scandinavian coldblood horses, racing around a track while pulling a driver in a two-wheeled cart called a "sulky". Racehorses compete in the gait of trotting. Races are most often conducted over distances from 1,609 metres (1 mile) to 3,140 metres. Most harness racing tracks typically measure 1,000 metres but there are examples of both longer and shorter tracks.

Racing is administered by the Swedish Trotting Association, which is a part-owner of ATG, the Swedish Horse Racing Totalisator Board.

Races are started in one of two ways, either from behind a mobile barrier, using a mobile start or from a circular starting system. The mobile barrier is a car with two long arms, behind which the horses line up before moving to the starting line. When the wings of the gate swing back, the starting vehicle speeds off, thus releasing the horses.

== Major races ==
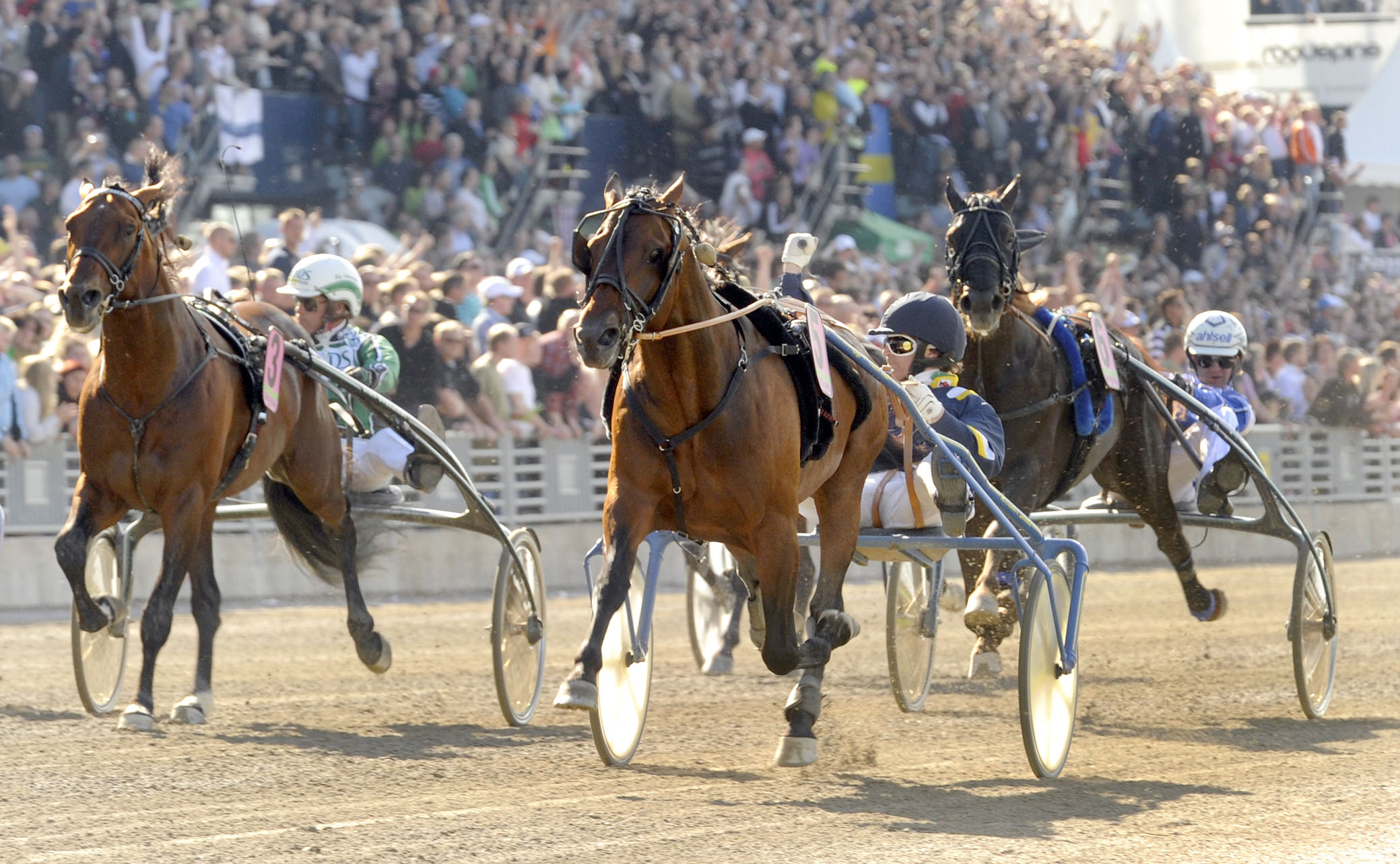
2010 Elitloppet finish-line

Elitloppet is an annual, invitational Group One harness event that has taken place at Solvalla Racetrack in Stockholm, Sweden since 1952. The competition is regarded as one of the most prestigious international events in trotting.

Other important Group One races include the Swedish Trotting Derby, Swedish Trotting Criterium, Åby Stora Pris, Olympiatravet and Hugo Åbergs Memorial.

== History ==
In the 19th century, the sport became more organized since the first clubs and meetings were held in different parts of Sweden. From 1898 to 1923, parimutuel betting was illegal.

In 1907, Jägersro Racetrack in Malmö was inaugurated. Today, it is the oldest race track for trotting in the country.

In the 1927, Solvalla opened in Stockholm. It is today the largest harness racing venue in the Nordic countries.

In 1950, the horse Scotch Fez won the Prix d'Amérique with driver Sören Nordin. It was the first significant international victory for Swedish harness racing.

The first Elitloppet was run in 1952 under the name of Solvallas Jubileumslopp (approximately "Solvalla's Jubilee Race"). Winner the opening year was the German horse Permit. The following year, the event changed name to Elitloppet.

In 1993, the Swedish mare Queen L., driven by Stig H. Johansson, became the first horse born in Sweden to win the Prix d'Amérique.
