= UET Masters Series =

Harness racing series

UET Masters Series is a harness racing series arranged by European Trotting Union. It was launched in 2012 as a successor of European Grand Circuit that was competed since 1956.

The series consist of four Grand Slam races (Prix d'Amerique, Lotteria, Elitloppet and Oslo Grand Prix) and almost one hundred Group 1 or Group 2 races in eight different European countries. The ranking is similar to ATP World Tour on tennis. Five best horses of every race collect points. These points are calculated from the last 365 days and a new updated ranking list is released weekly.

From 12 to 16 top ranked horses meet every September on a final race which is named UET Trotting Masters (French: UET Masters du Trot). The final is held each year on a different racecourse. The first UET Trotting Masters was raced at the Solvalla racetrack in Stockholm, Sweden.

== Points ==
Place	Grand Slam	Group I	Group II
1st	1000	500	250
2nd	600	300	150
3rd	400	200	100
4th	200	100	50
5th	100	50	25

== Finals 2012–2015 ==
Years	Track	Winner	Driver	Runner-up	Third place	Winning time
2012	(Sweden) Solvalla, Stockholm	(Sweden) Sebastian K	Åke Svanstedt	(France) Save the Quick	(France) Quarcio du Chene	1:11,7a
2013	(France) Vincennes, Paris	(France) Ready Cash	Franck Nivard	(France) Timoko	(France) The Best Madrik	1:11,7a
2014	(Denmark) Charlottenlund, Copenhagen	(Sweden) Ed You	Torbjörn Jansson	(Sweden) Mosaique Face	(Sweden) Canaka B.F.	1:12,4a
2015	(Belgium) Hippodrome de Wallonie, Mons	(Sweden) Mosaique Face	Lutfi Kolgjini	(Sweden) Creatine	(Italy) Oasis Bi	1:11,7a
2016	(Norway) Bjerke Travbane, Oslo	(United States) Nuncio	Örjan Kihlström	(Italy) Oasis Bi	(Sweden) Mosaique Face	1:10,7a

== Sources ==
- UET Masters Series at UET homepage
