= Varenne =

Italian Standardbred racehorse (1995–2026)

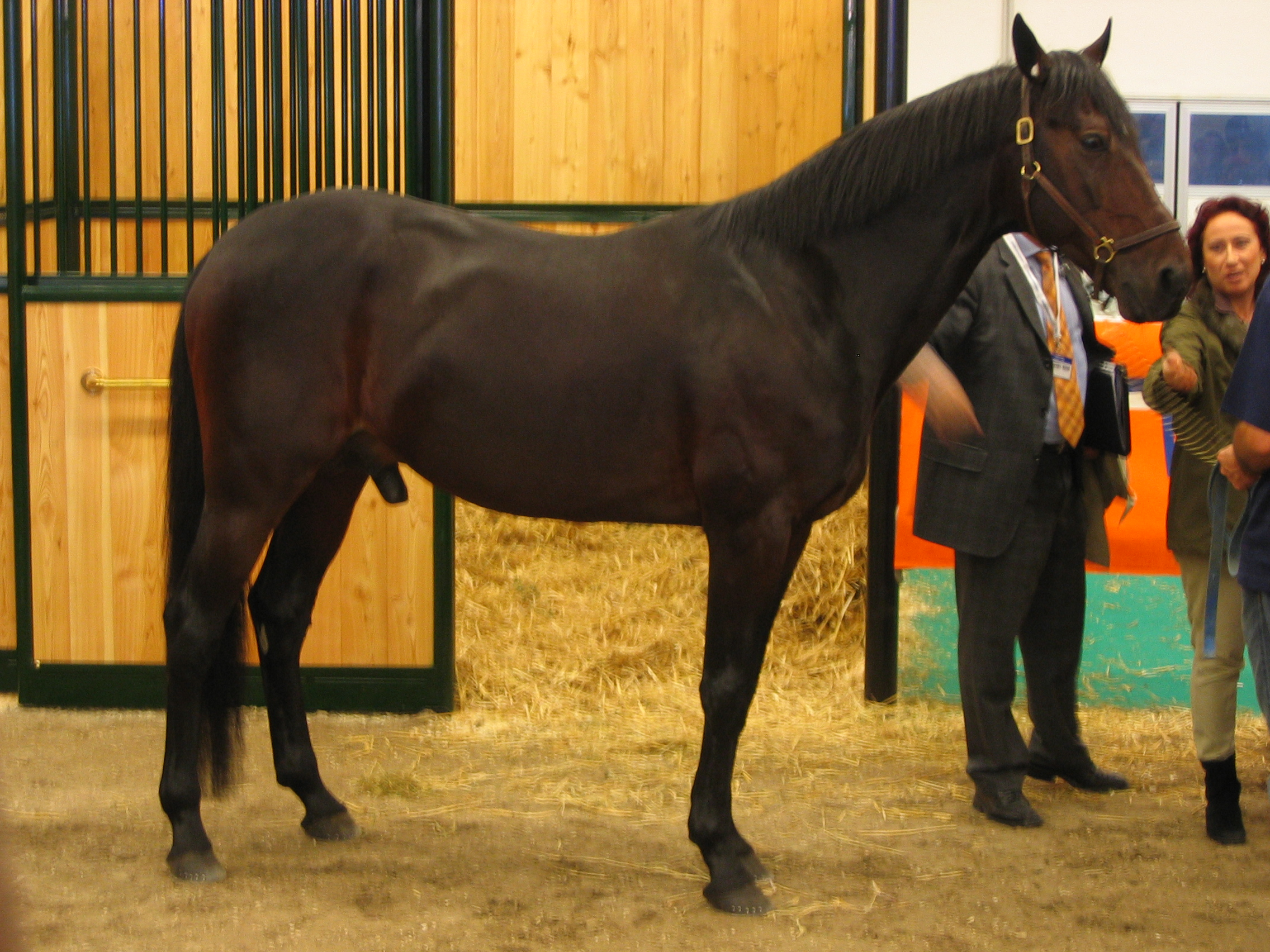
- Varenne in 2004
- Breed: Italian Trotter
- Sire: Waikiki Beach
- Grandsire: Speedy Somolli
- Dam: Ialmaz
- Maternal grandsire: Zebu
- Sex: Stallion
- Foaled: 19 May 1995
- Died: 18 August 2026 (aged 31)
- Country: Italy
- Colour: Dark bay
- Trainer: Roger Grundin, Jori Turja

Record
- 73: 62-6-2

Earnings
- US$ 5,636,255

Major wins
- Italian Trotting Derby (1998); Gran Premio d'Europa (1999); Gran Premio Tino Triossi (1999); Gran Premio Continentale (1999); Preis der Besten (1999); Gran Premio Delle Nazioni (1999); European 5-year-old Championship (2000); Olympiatravet (2000, 2002); Gran Premio della Lotteria (2000, 2001, 2002); Gran Premio U.N.I.R.E. (2000, 2002); Gran Premio Giubileo (2000); Prix d'Amérique (2001, 2002); Elitloppet (2001, 2002); Elite-Rennen (2001); Breeders Crown (2001); Trot Mondial (2001); Gala' Internazionale del Trotto (2001); Grand Criterium de Vitesse (2002); St. Michel Race (2002); Hugo Åbergs Memorial (2002); Jubileumspokalen (2002); World Cup Trot (2000, 2001, 2002)

Awards
- Horse of the Year in Italy (2000, 2001, 2002); Horse of the Year in France (2001, 2002); Horse of the Year in the USA (2001)

Honours
- Four stamps in San Marino (2003); United States Harness Racing Hall of Fame (2010); Kanal 75 The best trotter of all time (2011)
- Last updated on: 2011-10-13.

Varenne (19 May 1995 – 18 August 2026) was an Italian dark bay racing trotter by Waikiki Beach out of Ialmaz by Zebu.

Varenne was considered to be the best trotter of all time. He won major international races and set multiple records.

== Overview ==
Varenne was foaled in Copparo, Italy. According to several veterinarians, he would never race due to a leg malformation. His first owner bought him for $6,000, but because of his perceived handicap (chip) sold him after the first race, considering him to have no future as a race horse.

He won 62 races (53 GPs-major races) at 11 distances (from 0.99 mile to 1.708 miles), while finishing second six times and third twice from 73 career starts. He earned US$8,750,000 (€6,035,665), a harness-racing record. Varenne holds the record as the most widely traveled horse in the history of horse racing, winning in 7 countries and on two continents.

Varenne was the sole European trotter to win the Breeders Crown (2001) in the U.S. where he set the world speed record ( 1 mile in 1.51.1 - average per kilometer 1.09.1). It was the first time he competed at the distance of 1 mile.

Another historical victory took place at the World Cup 2002 in Vincennes, where Varenne won even though the wheel of the sulky was broken, setting the world speed record of 2100 metres (unbeaten record 1.10.8 average per kilometer - track 1 kilometer).

In Finland on 14 July 2002, in "St. Michel Race" (Mikkeli), in front of 27,000 spectators, Varenne established the world speed record of 1.09.3 on 1000 metres tracks (includes 3 turns in comparison to American one-mile tracks with just two turns). This was his only race in Finland, the home country of his trainer, Jori Turja and keeper, Miss Iina Rastas. The owner of Varenne had earlier promised Turja that he could take Varenne to race in Finland once.

In May 2002 in the Elitlopp, Varenne won in a world record time of 1:53.1 in the elimination and then bested that mark by winning the final in 1:53 – the fastest mile so far (until St. Michel in Finland in July 2002) trotted around three turns (unbeaten record).

He was the first foreign horse to win the Horse of the Year award in the U.S. and the only foreign horse to win the Horse of the Year award in France, as well as the only horse to win Horse of the Year in 3 different countries, all in the same year (2001).

Varenne established numerous track records on various racetracks. He won the Prix d'Amérique twice (2001–2002), considered to be the most difficult race in harness racing (2700 meters / 1.708 miles - 18 starters).

His most prestigious victories included the Prix d'Amérique, Elitloppet, Gran Premio della Lotteria and Breeders Crown. He was the only horse to win the most important races in the same year (2001).

He won prestigious races around the world, beating champions including Moni Maker (3 times), Magician (1 time), Général du Pommeau (4 times), Fan Idole (5 times), Victory Tilly (4 times), Viking Kronos (1 time), Fool's Goal (1 time), Dream Vacation (2 times), Plesac (1 time).

In 2010, Varenne was inducted into the Harness Racing Museum & Hall of Fame in New York, an honor typically restricted to American horses only.

In May 2011, Kanal 75, the Swedish company that broadcasts harness racing on TV4 Sport in Sweden, asked 38 international media to name the best horse of all time. Varenne came out on top.

Known in Italy as "Il Capitano" (the Captain), he was the only animal in history with a press office staff. Thousands of gadgets, T-shirts and hats were produced in his name. For a number of months, the Italian cities were covered with giant posters depicting Varenne, and millions of Italians followed his victories on live television. His vet called him an "intelligent horse with incredible patience."

Varenne also raised money for disabled children. The proceeds of his 2002 victory at the “Premio Mario Locatelli” went entirely to charity for the Carlo Gnocchi Italian center. These proceeds helped complete the project on "Cascina Linterno" in Milan that provided a range of services for people with disabilities, including an equestrian facility for the rehabilitation of people with physical and mental disabilities, through horse therapy.

See his website: varenne.it

== Early life ==
Varenne, the offspring of American stallion Waikiki Beach and Italian mare Ialmaz, was born at Zenzalino horse breeding centre in Copparo, Italy, on May 19, 1995. The foal was named after the street Rue de Varenne, where the Italian embassy in Paris is located. Breeder of Varenne - Jean-Pierre Dubois, a successful French horseman - brought him to Normandy, France. After the stay in France, Varenne returned to Italy.

== Racing career ==
=== 1998 ===
As a three-year-old, Varenne began his racing career in Premio Primavalle in Bologna on April 4. His driver was his early trainer, Swedish Roger Grundin, but Varenne was disqualified. The second attempt was more successful. With Italian driver Giampaolo Minnucci, Varenne won Premio Mirtillo at Tor di Valle, Rome, on April 30. In October, he won the Italian trotting derby (Italian: Derby Italiano del Trotto), which was his most lucrative victory until Prix d'Amérique in early 2001. Varenne ended 1998 by finishing third in Gran Premio Orsi Mangelli. In his first year on the track, he won 8 of 12 races.

In 1998, Dubois sold his share in Varenne to Italian stockbroker Vincenzo "Enzo" Giordano for €50,000. Varenne also switched trainera to Finnish-born and Italy-based Jori Turja. Turja, as well as driver Minnucci, remained Varenne's partner for the remainder of the horse's career.

=== 1999 ===
In 1999, Varenne had a perfect record: 14 wins out of 14 starts. He won Gran Premio d'Europa, Gran Premio Tino Triossi and Gran Premio Continentale, all major races in his native Italy. In the fall of that year, the stallion for the first time raced outside his home country. In October, at the Daglfing track in Munich, Germany, Varenne won Preis der Besten against older and more experienced competitors. After the win in Gran Premio delle Nazioni at San Siro, Milan, Turja and company again turned their attention abroad. On December 26, Varenne wrapped up his four-year-old season by winning Prix Ariste Hémard at Vincennes, Paris.

=== 2000 ===
On January 30, 2000, Varenne made his first attempt to win Prix d'Amérique at Vincennes. He finished 3rd behind French horses General du Pommeau and Galopin du Ravary. In May, on his first try, he won Gran Premio della Lotteria, the biggest international Italian race. Later that month, he failed to win perhaps the most prestigious one-mile harness race in Europe - Elitloppet at Solvalla in Stockholm, Sweden.

18 races in 2000 meant 13 wins, including the European 5-year-old Championship, Olympiatravet, Gran Premio Giubileo and Gran Premio Gaetano Turilli. During the year, Varenne won World Cup Trot, a competition stretching over a number of races. He repeated the feat two years later.

=== 2001 ===
In 2001, Varenne took all of the top three aged harness events in Europe, as well as the biggest one in North America.

It started with a victory in Prix d'Amérique on January 28. Varenne took the lead early in the race and maintained that position all the way. After a couple of smaller wins, he again took Gran Premio della Lotteria in Naples on May 6. Three weeks later, he defeated the reigning champion in Elitloppet, Victory Tilly, although he was parked for most of the race. Varenne suffered his only loss of the year to Jackhammer in Gran Premio U.N.I.R.E in Milan. After returning to his winning ways in Elite-Rennen at Gelsenkirchen, Germany, Varenne crossed the Atlantic for his first journey to North America.

The first stop was Meadowlands Racetrack, New Jersey, and the biggest aged harness event in North America: the $1 million Breeders Crown Open Trot on July 28. After Varenne's sweep of the three greatest European races (he was the first horse to accomplish this in 34 years) the expectations were enormous. The competition consisted of some of the best American trotters, e.g. Dream Vacation, Plesac, Fool's Goal, and Magician. Varenne advanced to the lead, but Minnucci let John Campbell and Dream Vacation overtake them. Varenne was then parked outside Dream Vacation, and in the stretch, he left the opponents far behind. The winning margin was 4 ½ lengths, and with the time of 1:51.1m (European way of timing: 1:09.1m km rate), Varenne beat Self Possessed's one-mile world record by two tenths of a second.

After the success, Varenne was intended to race at Meadowlands again, this time in the Nat Ray Trot. This was not the case, and he did not make an appearance until September 22, when he won the Trot Mondial in Montreal, Quebec, Canada. In December, Varenne rounded off the year with two wins in Italy. Out of the 14 races Varenne and Minnucci participated in, they were victorious in 13.

=== 2002 ===
In 2001, Varenne was the first horse in 34 years to win the Prix d'Amérique, Gran Premio della Lotteria, and Elitloppet in the same year. In 2002, he became the first to win the triple two years in a row.

Varenne took the lead at an early stage in Prix d'Amérique in 2002 and grabbed the second biggest prize cheque of his career: €400,000. In Gran Premio Mario Locatelli at San Siro, Milan, for the first time since his debut, Varenne was driven by a driver other than Minnucci. Finnish Jorma Kontio was chosen and won. After wins in Gran Premio Mario Locatelli, Grand Criterium de Vitesse and Olympiatravet, Varenne and Minnucci beat the event record in Gran Premio della Lotteria with the time of 1:10.8 (km rate).

Elitloppet on May 26 meant another defended title and another event record (1:10.2 km rate). Thereafter, the people around Varenne focused their attention to the World Cup Trot. If one horse won all five legs of the world cup, a massive bonus (€1 million) would be paid. The first leg was Gran Premio U.N.I.R.E, the second leg was Hugo Åbergs Memorial at Jägersro in Malmö, Sweden, the third leg was Jubileumspokalen at Solvalla, Stockholm, and the fourth leg was Coupe du Monde de Trot at Vincennes, Paris. Varenne and Minnucci won all of these races. In between, Varenne won the St. Michel Race in Mikkeli, Finland. With the time 1:09.3 (km rate), he set a new world record on a 1000m track, a record that stood for 10 years. Combined with the world record set in the Breeders Crown the previous year, Varenne was the world record holder on a mile track as well as on a 1000m track.

Before Trot Mondial in Montreal, reports appeared, saying the up-coming race would be Varenne's last. The event took place on September 28, 2002. Varenne and Minnucci faced, among others, American Fool's Goal and French mare Fan Idole. Varenne had the lead but was passed by Fan Idole in the stretch and finished second. After the race, Varenne was disqualified for running inside the pylons. Before the race, it seemed, according to Varenne's groom Iina Rastas, that Fan Idole got taken with Varenne. When Fan Idole in 2004 was retired from racing, Varenne was chosen to be her first stud.

Despite rumours of a comeback, Trot Mondial was Varenne's last race. He ended his career by being disqualified, just as he had started it almost four and half years earlier, the only two races he finished outside the money. The 15 races and 14 wins in 2002 took Varennes' tally up to 62 career victories, 6 seconds, and 2 thirds from 73 starts. With US$5,919,961 (€6,035,665) earned, Varenne is the richest trotter ever.

== Career as a sire ==
From 2003, when Varenne started his breeding career, until 2008, he stood at Allevamento Il Grifone in Vigone (Metropolitan City of Turin) in his homeland Italy. His first foal, delivered by the mare Vendee on January 5, 2004, was a colt named Icaro del Ronco. During the four years at Allevamento Il Grifone, Varenne sired between 126 and 168 foals per year. Among the offspring born 2004-2005 are Swedish star mare Lie Detector (SEK 4 886 131) with several wins in classic races to her name. Italian mare Lana Del Rio has won a number of Group 1 races, e.g. Gran Premio Nazionale. Lord Capar (Sweden/Italy) and Southwind Serena (USA) are two other successful trotters sired by Varenne. In 2008, Varenne was moved to Menhammar Stuteri outside Stockholm, Sweden, where Varenne's stands for c. €750 (insemination) + €15,000 (live foal). Menhammar veterinarian Johan Hellander, claims that Varenne is "a marvellous stud stallion" that "does exactly what you ask him to" and that Varenne's service would be more expensive if he were not so fertile.

== Death ==
Varenne died following complications after a heart attack at LJ Stud Farm in Eboli, on 18 August 2026, at the age of 31.

== Awards and recognition ==
Varenne was named the Horse of the Year in Italy 2000, 2001, and 2002 and received the same award in France in 2001, 2002, and in USA 2001. Harness Racing Museum & Hall of Fame in New York.

== Pedigree ==
Pedigree of Varenne (ITY)
Sire Waikiki Beach (USA)	Speedy Somolli (USA)	Speedy Crown (USA)	Speedy Scot (USA)
Sire Waikiki Beach (USA)	Speedy Somolli (USA)	Speedy Crown (USA)	Missile Toe (USA)
Sire Waikiki Beach (USA)	Speedy Somolli (USA)	Somolli (USA)	Star's Pride (USA)
Sire Waikiki Beach (USA)	Speedy Somolli (USA)	Somolli (USA)	Laurita Hanover (USA)
Sire Waikiki Beach (USA)	Hula Lobell (USA)	Super Bowl (USA)	Star's Pride (USA)
Sire Waikiki Beach (USA)	Hula Lobell (USA)	Super Bowl (USA)	Pillow Talk (USA)
Sire Waikiki Beach (USA)	Hula Lobell (USA)	Hollys Margeo (USA)	Blaze Hanover (USA)
Sire Waikiki Beach (USA)	Hula Lobell (USA)	Hollys Margeo (USA)	Clever Diller (USA)
Dam Ialmaz (ITY)	Zebu (ITY)	Sharif Di Iesolo (ITY)	Quicksong (USA)
Dam Ialmaz (ITY)	Zebu (ITY)	Sharif Di Iesolo (ITY)	Odile De Sassy (FR)
Dam Ialmaz (ITY)	Zebu (ITY)	Keystone Lady (USA)	Hickory Pride (USA)
Dam Ialmaz (ITY)	Zebu (ITY)	Keystone Lady (USA)	Lady Frost (USA)
Dam Ialmaz (ITY)	Baree (ITY)	Speedy Crown (USA)	Speedy Scot (USA)
Dam Ialmaz (ITY)	Baree (ITY)	Speedy Crown (USA)	Missile Toe (USA)
Dam Ialmaz (ITY)	Baree (ITY)	Spree Hanover (USA)	Star's Pride (USA)
Dam Ialmaz (ITY)	Baree (ITY)	Spree Hanover (USA)	Spry Hanover (USA)

- Varenne was inbred 3x3 to Speedy Crown, meaning that the stallion appears twice in the third generation of his pedigree. He was also inbred 4x4x4 to Star's Pride.

== See also ==
- List of historical horses
