= Copiad =

Swedish Standardbred racehorse

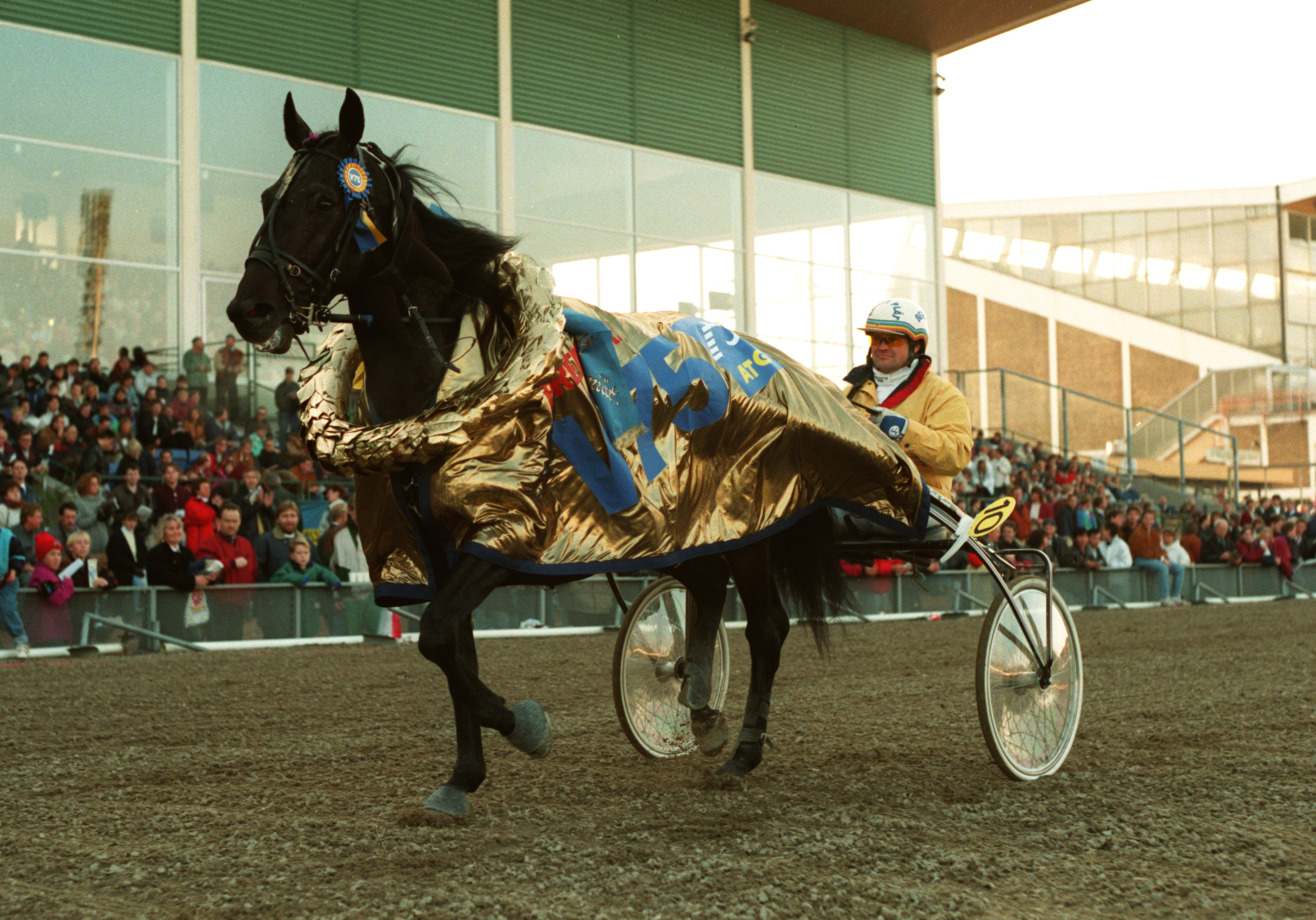
- Erik Berglöf and Copiad at Jägersro racetrack 1993.
- Breed: Standardbred
- Sire: Texas
- Grandsire: Super Bowl
- Dam: Bibbi Girl
- Maternal grandsire: Big Lama
- Sex: Stallion
- Foaled: 2 July 1989
- Country: Sweden
- Colour: Dark bay
- Breeder: Trygve Kraft
- Owner: Stall Succé
- Trainer: Erik Berglöf

Record
- 81: 50-9-6

Earnings
- US$2,416,093

Major wins
- Gran Premio Unire Consiglio (1993); Breeders Crown (1993); Oslo Grand Prix (1994, 1995); Finlandia-Ajo (1994); Elitloppet (1994, 1995); Momarken Grand Prix (1994); Gran Premio Vittorio Di Capua (1994); Olympiatravet (1995, 1996); Forus Open (1995); Preis der Besten (1995)

Awards
- Horse of the Year (1994)
- Last updated on: 2009-01-29.

Copiad (2 July 1989 — 19 October 2012) was a Swedish breeding stallion and former racing trotter by Texas out of Bibbi Girl by Big Lama.

His most prestigious victories include Elitloppet (1994, 1995), Oslo Grand Prix (1994, 1995), Finlandia-Ajo (1994) and Olympiatravet (1995, 1996). At the end of his career, the stallion had earned US$2,416,093. The trainer and driver (in all but one race) during Copiad's racing career was Swedish Erik Berglöf.

== Background ==
Copiad was sired by Texas (1974-2005), an American stallion by Triple Crown winner Super Bowl and out of Elitloppet champion Elma. As a colt, Texas competed with great results in USA. He won Kentucky Futurity and finished second in Hambletonian. Texas started his breeding career in USA, where he sired top racers Grades Singing (1982-2007, winner of Breeders Crown, Maple Leaf Trotting, Gran Premio della Lotteria, Gran Premio delle Nazioni and Olympiatravet), Southern Newton (b. 1985, winner of Yonkers Trot) and Nordin Hanover (b. 1985, winner of Preis der Besten and Oslo Grand Prix). 1982 was the year with the largest quantity of born foals by Texas in USA, 102. The amount decreased the following years, and later in the 1980s, Texas was brought to Sweden. In 1989, his first sizeable Swedish crop was born. Among its members were future superstar Copiad and top trotter Bolets Igor (winner of Preis der Besten, Copenhagen Cup and Jubileumspokalen). None of the later Swedish trotters sired by Texas would be able to match the success of these two stallions. In 1994, Texas was appointed Swedish Elite Stallion.

The dam of Copiad, Swedish mare Bibbi Girl (b. 1978), was awarded Swedish Elite Mare title in 1995. The second most successful among her offspring is Eko Succe (b. 1988), a gelding that earned SEK372,630, to be compared with Copiad's SEK15,861,650.

== Career as a racing horse ==
=== 1992-1993 - 3 and 4 years old ===
Copiad entered his first race in September 1992, at age 3. The debut ended in a disqualification, but he won five out of seven following races that year. As a 4-year-old, he competed in a number of big events. He finished fifth in Konung Gustaf V:s Pokal and second in Sprintermästaren, before he claimed Italian Gran Premio Unire Consiglio and Swedish Breeders Crown (despite going off-stride) in the fall of 1993.

=== 1994 - 5 years old ===
When Copiad started 1994 by adding seven to the five consecutive wins ending the 1993 campaign, he reached the longest winning streak of his career, 12 wins in a row. Among the wins in the spring of 1994 was Sweden's biggest event Elitloppet at Solvalla, as well as Finnish major race Finlandia-Ajo and Norway's Oslo Grand Prix. In Elitloppet on 29 May, Copiad faced first and foremost American star Pine Chip, winner of previous year's Kentucky Futurity, World Trotting Derby and Breeders Crown, as well as runner-up in Hambletonian. The two stallions won their elimination heats. In the final, Copiad grabbed the lead and favourite Pine Chip was parked outside. Together, they opened up a large gap to the pack before the stretch. When Pine Chip broke stride just before the finish line, Copiad had already beaten his opponent. Elitloppet 1994 is considered a huge moment in Swedish trotting history. Copiad claimed Momarken Grand Prix, Årjängs Stora Sprinterlopp and Gran Premio Vittorio Di Capua during the rest of the year.

=== 1995 - 6 years old ===
In April 1995, Copiad won Olympiatravet at Åby and Forus Open in Norway, before repeating the previous year's victories in Oslo Grand Prix and Elitloppet. Copiad won Preis der Besten and finished runner-up in big races like Elite-Rennen, Åby Stora Pris and Gran Premio delle Nazione.

=== 1996 - 7 years old ===
In the campaign of 1996, Olympiatravet was once more the first major target. Copiad defended the title, but that was to be the last big win in his career. In Finlandia-Ajo, the stallion was disqualified, and in Elitloppet, the two-time champion failed to reach the final after going off-stride in the elimination race. After winning a small race in early July, Copiad galloped in Årjängs Stora Sprinterlopp. On 23 July, in Hugo Åbergs Memorial, Copiad was parked outside leader Triple T. Storm by driver Berglöf. The two trotters kept a staggering pace and Copiad gave up before the stretch. Copiad was later confirmed to be unwell, and his connections decided to end the racing career.

== Career as a breeding stallion ==
After Copiad had quit racing, he started a new career as a breeding stallion at Alebäcks stuteri. During the first four years, he sired in average more than 100 foals per year. In 2002, he became father of only 39 foals and the following year meant an ever-smaller amount of foals. In late 2003, Copiad lost the permission to cover brooding mares in Sweden. As a consequence, Copiad moved abroad, and has since 2004 been acting as a stud horse in both Hungary and Germany. In September 2009, it was reported that Copiad had retired from his career as a breeding stallion. As a consequence, he was moved from Germany to breeder Trygve Kraft in Värmland, Sweden.

When Copiad lost the covering permission in 2003, it was due to a lack of successful offspring. The richest of his offspring are geldings Lukas Lupin (winner of ≈US$450,000) and Even Who (5th in the Swedish Trotting Derby) together with stallions The Big Blue World and Sun Protection.

== Pedigree ==
Pedigree of Copiad Sweden
Sire Texas (USA)	Super Bowl	Star's Pride	Worthy Boy
Sire Texas (USA)	Super Bowl	Star's Pride	Star Drift
Sire Texas (USA)	Super Bowl	Pillow Talk	Rodney
Sire Texas (USA)	Super Bowl	Pillow Talk	Bewitch
Sire Texas (USA)	Elma	Hickory Smoke	Titan Hanover
Sire Texas (USA)	Elma	Hickory Smoke	Misty Hanover
Sire Texas (USA)	Elma	Cassin Hanover	Hoot Mon
Sire Texas (USA)	Elma	Cassin Hanover	Goddess Hanover
Dam Bibbi Girl (SWE)	Big Lama (USA)	Jamie	Darnley
Dam Bibbi Girl (SWE)	Big Lama (USA)	Jamie	Molly Spencer
Dam Bibbi Girl (SWE)	Big Lama (USA)	Lama (FR)	Quiroga II
Dam Bibbi Girl (SWE)	Big Lama (USA)	Lama (FR)	Dragonne III
Dam Bibbi Girl (SWE)	Marion	Mars II (FR)	Feu Follet X
Dam Bibbi Girl (SWE)	Marion	Mars II (FR)	Victorieuse III
Dam Bibbi Girl (SWE)	Marion	Kate Day	Scotchman
Dam Bibbi Girl (SWE)	Marion	Kate Day	Lady Day
