= List of Scandinavian harness horse races =

A list of notable harness horse races which take place annually in Scandinavia, which currently hold Group status in Europe.

== Group 1 ==
Month	Race Name	Racecourse	Country	Dist. (m)	Age/Sex
April	Prix Étain Royal	Seinäjoki	Finland	2,100	4yo+
April	Olympiatravet	Åby	Sweden	2,140	3yo+
May	Finlandia-Ajo	Vermo	Finland	1,609	3yo+
May	Copenhagen Cup	Charlottenlund	Denmark	2,011	3yo+
May	Elitloppet	Solvalla	Sweden	1,609	4yo+
May	Drottning Silvias Pokal	Åby	Sweden	2,140	4yo f
May	Konung Gustaf V:s Pokal	Åby	Sweden	2,140	4yo c&g
June	Oslo Grand Prix	Bjerke	Norway	2,100	3yo+
June	Kymi Grand Prix	Kouvola	Finland	2,100	3yo+
June	Norrbottens Stora Pris	Boden	Sweden	2,140	3yo+
June	E3 (long)	Bergsåker	Sweden	2,140	3yo c&g
June	E3 (long)	Bergsåker	Sweden	2,140	3yo f
July	Sprintermästaren	Halmstad	Sweden	1,609	4yo
July	Suur-Hollola-Ajo	Lahti	Finland	2,140	4yo+
July	Ulf Thoresens Minneløp	Jarlsberg	Norway	2,100	3yo
July	St. Michel	Mikkeli	Finland	1,609	4yo+
July	Stochampionatet	Axevalla	Sweden	2,640	4yo f
July	Hugo Åbergs Memorial	Jägersro	Sweden	1,609	4yo+
August	Åby Stora Pris	Åby	Sweden	1,640	4yo+
August	Jubileumspokalen	Solvalla	Sweden	2,140	5yo
August	E3 (short)	Borlänge	Sweden	1,640	3yo c&g
August	E3 (short)	Borlänge	Sweden	1,640	3yo f
August	Dansk Hoppe Derby	Charlottenlund	Denmark	2,000	4yo f
August	Sundsvall Open Trot	Bergsåker	Sweden	2,140	3yo+
August	Danskt Travderby	Charlottenlund	Denmark	3,000	4yo
September	Finskt Travderby	Helsinki	Finland	2,600	4yo
September	Norsk Travderby	Bjerke	Norway	2,600	4yo
September	Norsk Travkriterium	Bjerke	Norway	2,100
September	Derbystoet	Jägersro	Sweden	2,140	4yo f
September	Svenskt Travderby	Jägersro	Sweden	2,640	4yo
September	Svenskt Travkriterium	Solvalla	Sweden	2,640	3yo
September	Svenskt Trav Oaks	Solvalla	Sweden	2,140	3yo f
October	Kriterium	Tampere	Finland	2,600	3yo
November	Svensk Uppfödningslöpning	Jägersro	Sweden	1,640	2yo

== Group 2 ==
Month	Race Name	Racecourse	Country	Dist. (m)	Age/Sex
April	Habibs Minneløp	Klosterskogen	Norway	2,100	4yo
April	Klosterskogen Race	Klosterskogen	Norway	2,100	3yo+
May	Örebro Intn'l	Örebro	Sweden	3,140	3yo+
