= Olympiatravet =

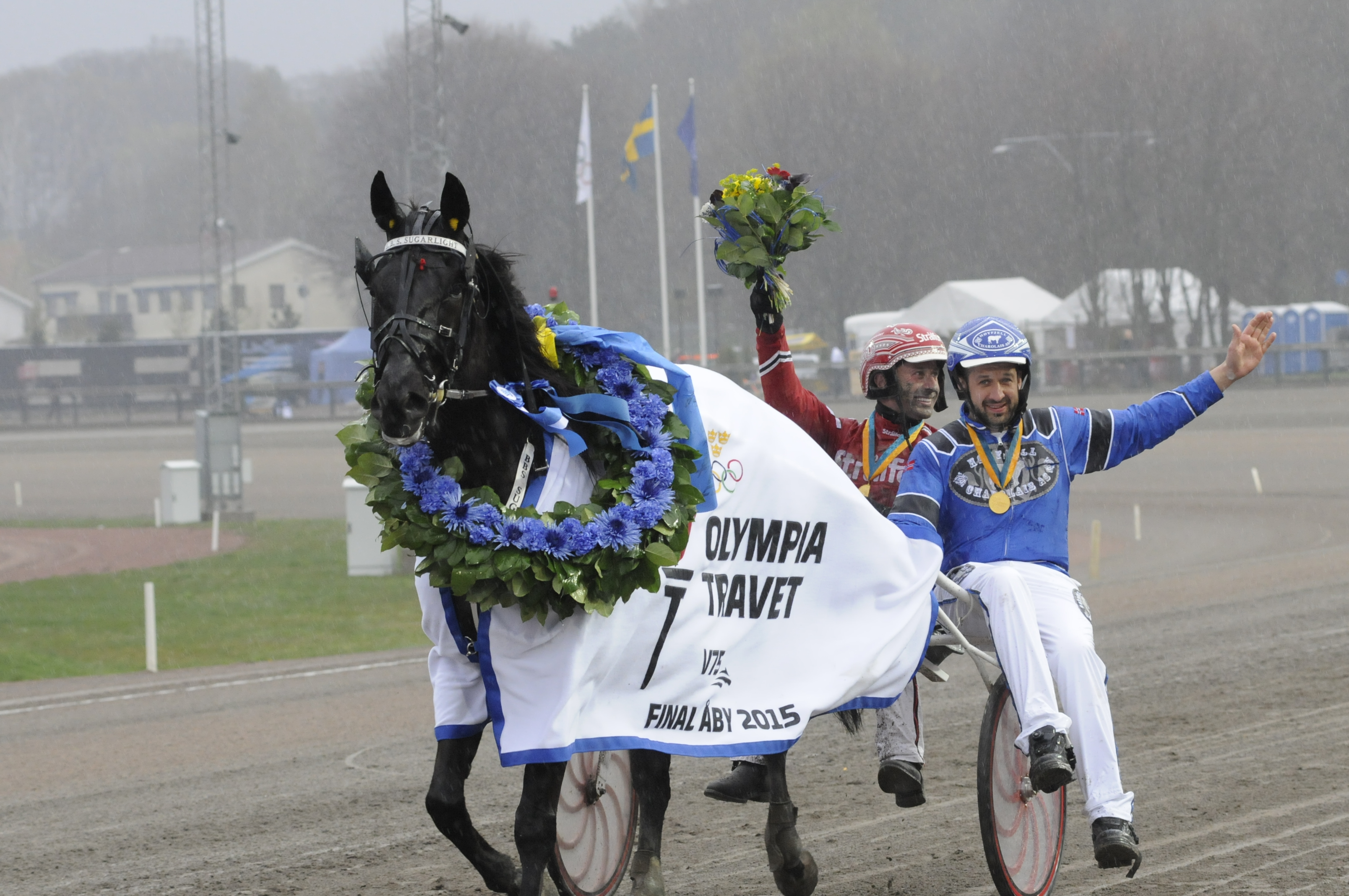
- B.B.S.Sugarlight after his victory in 2015.
- Class: Group One International
- Location: Åby Racetrack, Mölndal, Sweden
- Inaugurated: 1979
- Race type: Harness race for standardbred trotters
- Website: Olympiatravet (Swedish)

Race information
- Distance: 2,140 meters (1.33 miles)
- Track: Left-handed 1,000 meter track (0.62 mile)
- Qualification: Via invitations or qualifying races. 3 year-olds and up
- Purse: ≈US$326,000

Olympiatravet (literally "The Olympic Trot") is an annual Group One harness event for trotters that is held at Åby Racetrack in Mölndal, 10 km south of Gothenburg, Sweden. The event was carried through for the first time in 1979. In 2009, the purse of the final was approximately US$326,000 (SEK2,750,000).

== Collaboration with the Swedish olympic movement ==
Olympiatravet is arranged by the Swedish Horse Racing Totalisator Board, ATG, together with The Swedish Olympic Committee, SOC. The Swedish olympic movement receives a share of the money gambled on the event. 90% of this share is kept by SOC, while the remaining 10% is given to Sveriges Handikappsförbund (SHIF) and athletes competing in the Paralympics. In total, Olympiatravet has brought the olympic movement over US$27 million (over SEK163 million), and in 2008 alone the amount was ≈US$1,767,000 (SEK10,500,000). In 2009, another SEK 10,340,000 was handed over to SOC (SEK9.4 million) and SHIF (SEK940,000).

In order to honour the winners, through the years, olympic athletes have visited the Olympiatravet Day as well as the tracks and days of the qualifying races. The winners in 2009, Triton Sund and his connections, were celebrated by, among others, olympic gold medalists Team Anette Norberg (curling) as well as cross-country skiing star Charlotte Kalla.

== Racing conditions ==
The ten contestants can make the final in three ways - through qualifying races, via an invitation or by being the reigning champion of the event. To race in the final, and thus both to enter the qualifying races and to come in contention for invitations, a horse must be of age three or above.

In 2009, three qualifying races were carried out. The winners and runners-up of these races were awarded starts in Olympiatravet's final. The winner of Rommeheatet, a race a week before the Olympiatravet final, was also awarded a place in the final. To fill up the rest of the ten places in the final, Åby invites horses and offers them wild cards. In 2009, four such wild cards were handed out.

=== Starting method and distance ===
With the exceptions of 1980 and 1982, a motorized starting gate has been used to launch the race since the event began in 1979. The distance has always been 2,140 meters.

== Location ==
The venue varied during the first years. The first Olympiatravet was held at Jägersro. The following editions were raced at either Solvalla (1980 and 1984) or Åby (1982), before the latter racetrack became the permanent host as from 1985.

== The 2009 Olympiatravet ==
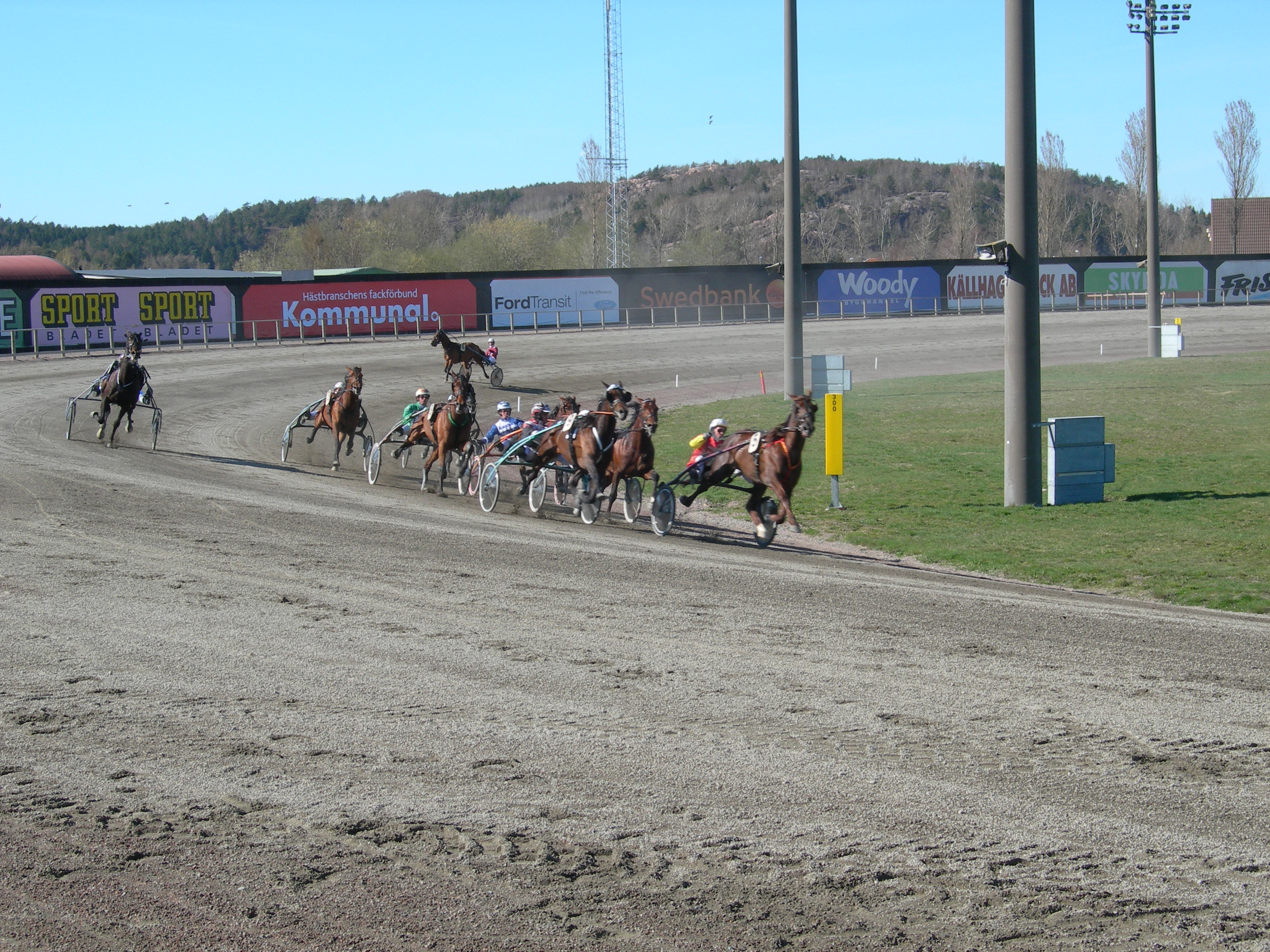
The final lap of Olympiatravet 2009.

From the three regular Olympiatravet qualification races, five horses progressed to the final: Colombian Necktie, Dig For Dollars, Global Investment, Torvald Palema and Triton Sund. Finders Keepers won the extra qualification race, Rommeheatet. The four wild cards were given to French duo Oiseau de Feux and L'Amiral Mauzun, as well as Garland Kronos and Adams Hall. Swedish trainer Åke Svanstedt thus had three contenders in the race, three horses that won him a treble in the 2008 Olympiatravet: Adams Hall (2nd in 2008), Finders Keepers (3rd) and Torvald Palema (winner).

In the first starting attempt, L'Amiral Mauzun had a mishap to his equipment. The horse started to scamper uncontrollably, and the attempt was called off. The French horse ran for almost 2,000 meters before he finally settled down. The veterinarian at Åby took the decision to take the French horse out of the race.

The second starting attempt was successful. French Oiseau de Feux went to the front and kept a high pace (500m: 1:08.3 (km rate), 1000m: 1:10.0 (km rate)). He was followed by Torvald Palema, Colombian Necktie and Finders Keepers on the rail. On the outside, Garland Kronos was first, with Global Investment, Triton Sund and Dig For Dollars following him. Adams Hall was, after initially going off-stride, last. With approximately 700 meters to go, Triton Sund started to advance. He made good progress, and down the stretch, Triton Sund and Oiseau de Feux fought for the title. The Swedish stallion managed to win by a neck. Oiseau de Feux had a safe margin to Torvald Palema, who came in third, in front of Colombian Necktie and Adams Hall, who grabbed the last places in the money. Triton Sund was timed in 1:11.1/2,140m (km rate), which equalled the world record mark for middle distance races run on 1,000 meter tracks, a record set by French Jag de Bellouet in 2006.

The 2009 Olympiatravet attendance of 17,401 meant a new record attendance for Åby Racetrack.

== Past winners ==
=== Horses with most wins ===
- 3 - Gidde Palema (2003, 2004, 2005)
- 2 - Varenne (2000, 2002)
- 2 - Scandal Play (1997, 1999)
- 2 - Copiad (1995, 1996)
- 2 - Queen L. (1993, 1994)

=== Sires with at least two different winning offsprings ===
- 3 - Texas (Copiad, Karate Chop, Grades Singing)
- 3 - Viking Kronos (Thai Tanic, Triton Sund, Maharajah)
- 2 - Alf Palema (Gidde Palema, Torvald Palema)

=== Drivers with most wins ===
- 4 - Stig H. Johansson
- 4 - Åke Svanstedt
- 3 - Örjan Kihlström
- 3 - Jorma Kontio

=== Trainers with most wins ===
- 4 - Stig H. Johansson
- 4 - Åke Svanstedt

=== Winner with lowest odds ===
- 1.13 - Varenne (2002)

=== Winner with highest odds ===
- 39.45 - Einarsin (1984)

=== Fastest winner ===
- 1:10.0 - Ringostarr Treb (2018)

=== All winners of Olympiatravet ===
Year	Horse	Driver	Trainer	Country of owner	Odds of winner	Winning time (km rate)
2019	Propulsion	Örjan Kihlström	Daniel Redén	Sweden	1.41 (ATG)	1:10.9
2018	Ringostarr Treb	Wilhelm Paal	Jerry Riordan	Italy	3.61	1:10.0
2017	Lionel	Göran Antonsen	Daniel Redén	Norway	14.79	1:10.9
2016	Your Highness	Björn Goop	Fabrice Souloy	Sweden	6.21	1:10.9
2015	B.B.S. Sugarlight	Peter Untersteiner	Fredrik Solberg	Norway	8.89	1:10.7
2014	Solvato	Veijo Heiskanen	Veijo Heiskanen	Sweden	5.11	1:10.9
2013	Maharajah	Örjan Kihlström	Stefan Hultman	Sweden	2.80	1:11.0
2012	Commander Crowe	Christophe Martens	Fabrice Souloy	Sweden	5.14	1:12.2
2011	Brioni	Joakim Lövgren	Joakim Lövgren	Germany	8.43	1:11.4
2010	Copper Beech	Conrad Lugauer	Conrad Lugauer	Sweden	65.03	1:11.6
2009	Triton Sund	Örjan Kihlström	Stefan Hultman	Sweden	4.77	1:11.1
2008	Torvald Palema	Åke Svanstedt	Åke Svanstedt	Sweden	8.29	1:12.2
2007	Gentleman	Thomas Uhrberg	Kari Lähdekorpi	Sweden	11.20	1:12.8
2006	Thai Tanic	Björn Goop	Olle Goop	Norway	6.46	1:13.0
2005	Gidde Palema	Åke Svanstedt	Åke Svanstedt	Sweden	1.51	1:12.9
2004	Gidde Palema	Åke Svanstedt	Åke Svanstedt	Sweden	4.66	1:12.9
2003	Gidde Palema	Åke Svanstedt	Åke Svanstedt	Sweden	19.92	1:13.1
2002	Varenne	Giampaolo Minnucci	Jori Turja	Italy	1.13	1:12.4
2001	Etain Royal	Jorma Kontio	Pirjo Vauhkonen	Finland	1.25	1:13.2
2000	Varenne	Giampaolo Minnucci	Jori Turja	Italy	2.76	1:12.7
1999	Scandal Play	Bo Eklöf	Lars Marklund	Sweden	4.47	1:14.8
1998	Rival Damkaer	Erik Adielsson	Tommy Strandqvist	Sweden	16.66	1:16.2
1997	Scandal Play	Bo Eklöf	Lars Marklund	Sweden	7.37	1:13.7
1996	Copiad	Erik Berglöf	Erik Berglöf	Sweden	1.68	1:13.9
1995	Copiad	Erik Berglöf	Erik Berglöf	Sweden	1.51	1:13.6
1994	Queen L.	Stig H. Johansson	Stig H. Johansson	Sweden	2.55	1:13.8
1993	Queen L.	Stig H. Johansson	Stig H. Johansson	Sweden	2.94	1:14.3
1992	Bravo Sund	Jorma Kontio	Veijo Heiskanen	Sweden	9.25	1:14.3
1991	Karate Chop	Bo Näslund	Bo Näslund	Sweden	16.38	1:15.1
1990	Jet Ribb	Hans G. Eriksson	Per-Erik Eriksson	Sweden	6.77	1:14.6
1989	Callit	Karl O. Johansson	Karl O. Johansson	Sweden	1.39	1:14.9
1988	Sugarcane Hanover	Gunnar Eggen	Gunnar Eggen	United States	5.83	1:14.4
1987	Grades Singing	Ulf Thoresen	Herve Filion	Canada	3.32	1:15.4
1986	Utah Bulwark	Stig H. Johansson	Stig H. Johansson	Sweden	2.50	1:14.5
1985	Meadow Road	Torbjörn Jansson	Torbjörn Jansson	Sweden	2.52	1:15.5
1984	Einarsin	Tapio Perttunen	Tapio Perttunen	Finland	39.45	1:15.1
1982	Jana Bloc	Ove R. Andersson	Ove R. Andersson	Sweden	2.08	1:18.8
1980	Don Ego	Stig H. Johansson	Stig H. Johansson	Sweden	2.75	1:18.4
1979	Pershing	Berndt Lindstedt	Berndt Lindstedt	Sweden	1.20	1:17.9

== See also ==
- List of Scandinavian harness horse races
