= European Grand Circuit =

European Grand Circuit (French: Grand Circuit européen) was a harness racing series arranged by European Trotting Union. It was held from 1956 to 2011. The competition was replaced by UET Masters Series in 2012.

The circuit consisted of the major European harness racing events, such as Elitloppet, Prix de France, Gran Premio Lotteria and Oslo Grand Prix. In 2011 14 races from seven countries were included.

== Winners 1956–2011 ==
Year	Winner
2011	(France) Rapide Lebel
2010	(Italy) Lisa America
2009	(Sweden) Torvald Palema
2008	(France) L'Amiral Mauzun
2007	(France) Oiseau de Feux
2006	(France) Jag de Bellouet
2005	(Sweden) (Norway) Steinlager
2004	(Sweden) Gidde Palema
2003	(Sweden) Gidde Palema
2002	(United States) (Denmark) Legendary Lover K
2001	(Sweden) Victory Tilly
2000	(Sweden) Victory Tilly
1999	(France) Giesolo de Lou
1998	(Sweden) Huxtable Hornline
1997	(Sweden) Zoogin
1996	(Sweden) Zoogin
1995	(Finland) Houston Laukko
1994	(Sweden) Copiad
1993	(Canada) (Germany) Sea Cove
1992	(Canada) (Germany) Sea Cove
1991	(Sweden) Atas Fighter L
1990	(United States) (Finland) Friendly Face
1989	(United States) (Finland) Friendly Face
1988	(France) Ourasi
1987	(United States) (Sweden) Grades Singing
1986	(France) Ourasi
1985	(France) Minou du Donjon
1984	(France) Lurabo
1983	(France) Ianthin
1982	(France) Idéal du Gazeau
1981	(France) Idéal du Gazeau
1980	(France) Idéal du Gazeau
1979	(United States) (Sweden) Pershing
1978	(France) Eleazar
1977	(France) Eleazar
1976	(France) Bellino II
1975	(France) Bellino II
1974	(United States) (Italy) Timothy T
1973	(France) Buffet II
1972	(United States) (Sweden) Dart Hanover
1971	(France) Une de Mai
1970	(France) Une de Mai
1969	(France) Une de Mai
1968	(France) Roquépine
1967	(France) Roquépine
1966	Not arranged
1965	(Italy) Elaine Rodney
1964	(United States) (Italy) Nike Hanover
1963	(France) Ozo
1962	(France) Nicias Grandchamp
1961	(Italy) Tornese
1960	(France) Hairos II
1959	(France) Jamin
1958	(France) Jariolan
1957	(France) Gélinotte
1956	(France) Gélinotte

== Sources ==
- Winners of the European Grand Circuit at Sukuposti.net
