= Gunnar Eggen =

Norwegian harness racer (1946–2024)

- Born: 3 January 1946
- Died: 10 October 2024 (aged 78); Oslo, Norway
- Occupation: Harness racer

Gunnar Eggen (3 January 1946 – 10 October 2024) was a Norwegian harness racer.

He won more than 5,000 harness races during his career, including victories in Oslo Grand Prix, Olympiatravet, and the March of Dimes Trot.

== Career ==
Eggen was born on 3 January 1946.

He won silver medals at the European championship in both 1981 and 1985. His achievements in 1988 included winning the Oslo Grand Prix with the horse Sugarcane Hanover, victory in the Swedish Olympiatravet, second place at Elitloppet, and victory at the legendary March of Dimes Trot in the United States, with Sugarcane Hanover. He became European champion in 1996. During his career he won a total of more than 5,000 races in Norway.

Eggen died on 10 October 2024, at the age of 78. Hailing from Sandefjord, he died at Ammerud in Oslo.
