= Varbanov =

Varbanov (Bulgarian: Върбанов) is a Bulgarian masculine surname, its feminine counterpart is Varbanova. Notable people with the surname include:

- Aleksandar Varbanov (born 1964), Bulgarian weightlifter
- Marin Varbanov (1932–1989), Bulgarian artist
- Nikolay Varbanov (born 1985), Bulgarian basketball player
- Ventsislav Varbanov (born 1962), Bulgarian politician
- Yordan Varbanov (born 1980), Bulgarian footballer
