= Swedish Trotting Oaks =

Swedish Trotting Oaks Svenskt Trav-Oaks
- Class: Group One National
- Location: Solvalla, Stockholm, Sweden
- Inaugurated: 1979
- Race type: Harness race for standardbred trotters

Race information
- Distance: 2,140 meters (1.33 miles)
- Track: Left-handed 1,000 meter track (0.62 mile)
- Qualification: Swedish 3-year-old fillies
- Purse: ≈US$286,000

The Swedish Trotting Oaks (Swedish: Svenskt Trav-Oaks or only Oaks) is an annual national Group One harness event for trotters that is held at Solvalla in Stockholm, Sweden. It is the biggest race for 3-year-old fillies in Sweden. The purse in the 2008 final was ≈US$286,000 (SEK 2,000,000), of which the winner Annicka won half.

== Location and date ==
The Swedish Trotting Oaks has, since the start in 1979, been arranged at Solvalla in Stockholm. In 1979, as well as during the years 1991-1994 and from 1998 to present, the finals have been held on the same day in late September or early October as the Swedish Trotting Criterium finals. In 1980 and in 1995–1997, the Oaks finals were raced up to a week before or after the Criterium finals. 1981–1990, the Oaks finals took place in July or August.

== Entering the event ==
To enter the Swedish Trotting Oaks, a filly owner is obliged to make four payments of totally ≈US$530 (SEK4,125) as of 2009. These payments are as well valid for the Swedish Trotting Criterium, which is held at the same day as the Oaks but are open for both colts and fillies. In addition to these costs, a supplementary fee of ≈US$410 (SEK3,180) is paid to enter the elimination races before the final. If a filly owner decides to enter the Criterium instead of the Oaks, the supplementary fee is twice as large, ≈US$820 (SEK6,360).

== Racing conditions ==
=== Distance ===
The distance in the Swedish Trotting Oaks is 2,140 meters (1.33 mile). This was the case in the premiere year of 1979, and has not been altered since.

=== Starting method ===
The first year, volt start was used in the Oaks, but from the second year and on, auto start has been used.

== Past winners ==
=== Drivers with most wins ===
- 4 - Stig H. Johansson
- 4 - Örjan Kihlström
- 2 - Leif Witasp
- 2 - Lennart Forsgren
- 2 - Torbjörn Jansson
- 2 - Jim Frick

=== Trainers with most wins ===
- 6 - Stig H. Johansson
- 2 - Leif Witasp
- 2 - Roger Walmann
- 2 - Tommy Hanné

=== Sires with at least two winning offsprings ===
- 2 - Count's Pride (Santa Pride, Eva Pride)
- 2 - Shatter Way (Divina Tilly, Pink Lady)
- 2 - The Prophet (Prophet Jill, Louise)

=== Mares with at least two winning offsprings ===
- 2 - Pixie (Emma Gee San, Kimbee San)

=== Winning mares that have also brood winners ===
- Pixie (1982), dam of Emma Gee San (1993) and Kimbee San (1999)

=== Winner with lowest odds ===
- Winning odds: 1.32 - Pixie (1982)

=== Winner with highest odds ===
- Winning odds: 32.94 - Early Southwind (2006)

=== Fastest winners ===
==== Auto start (1980 - present) ====
- 1:13.9 (km rate) - Annicka (2008)

==== Volt start (1979) ====
- 1:20.8 (km rate) - Prophet Jill (1979)

=== All winners of the Swedish Trotting Oaks ===
Year	Horse	Driver	Trainer	Odds of winner	Winning time (km rate)
2008	Annicka	Jörgen Westholm	Jörgen Westholm	3.32	1:13.9
2007	Sissel Godiva	Johnny Takter	Catrin Fajersson	4.05	1:15.4
2006	Early Southwind	Björn Goop	Timo Nurmos	32.94	1:14.4
2005	Electra Skift	Erik Adielsson	Stig H. Johansson	9.47	1:14.3
2004	Alexia Ås	Örjan Kihlström	Roger Walmann	6.32	1:14.3
2003	Giant Diablo	Örjan Kihlström	Roger Walmann	1.38	1:15.4
2002	Je T'Aime Dream	Stig H. Johansson	Stig H. Johansson	3.39	1:15.3
2001	Pine Dust	Örjan Kihlström	Stefan Hultman	1.58	1:15.1
2000	Johannita	Jim Frick	Jim Frick	6.41	1:14.8
1999	Kimbee San	Jim Frick	Stig H. Johansson	13.38	1:15.5
1998	Pine Princess	Örjan Kihlström	Nils Sylwén	3.31	1:15.5
1997	Simb Capi	Per Lennartsson	Lennart Wikström	6.81	1:16.2
1996	Hannah Newmen	Jorma Kontio	Ola Samuelsson	3.59	1:15.3
1995	Sissela Ås	Atle Hamre	Atle Hamre	1.62	1:17.1
1994	Love Me Do	Jan Rapp	Bengt Johansson	7.69	1:15.3
1993	Emma Gee San	Stig H. Johansson	Stig H. Johansson	2.96	1:16.3
1992	Sussie Ribb	Lennart Forsgren	Marianne Andersson	5.77	1:14.7
1991	Eva Pride	Torbjörn Jansson	Tommy Hanné	10.76	1:17.1
1990	Pink Lady	Leif Witasp	Leif Witasp	10.27	1:17.2
1989	Pershinette	Leif Witasp	Leif Witasp	2.77	1:17.3
1988	Katinka Broline	Björn Linder	Björn Linder	7.39	1:19.0
1987	Vivetta Orion	Thomas Bergkvist	Hans-Erik Eriksson	10.09	1:15.6
1986	Ecana Nibs	Lennart Forsgren	Lennart Forsgren	1.98	1:17.4
1985	Crown Fougett	Stig H. Johansson	Stig H. Johansson	8.20	1:22.6
1984	Santa Pride	Olle Elfstrand	Olle Elfstrand	2.31	1:17.0
1983	Evita Guvijo	Torbjörn Jansson	Tommy Hanné	6.68	1:18.6
1982	Pixie	Stig H. Johansson	Stig H. Johansson	1.32	1:16.6
1981	Divina Tilly	Karl-Gösta Fylking	Karl-Gösta Fylking	8.40	1:20.0
1980	Louise	Karl-Erik Nilsson	Karl-Erik Nilsson	4.70	1:20.5
1979	Prophet Jill	Ulf Nordin	Ulf Nordin	2.50	1:20.8
