= Billyjojimbob =

Canadian Standardbred racehorse

Billyjojimbob (1987–2002) was a champion Standardbred trotting gelding by Balanced Image out of Ginger Jewel by Tough Cookie.

Bred in Ontario, Canada, he won many stakes races of which the highlights were the Breeders Crown event for aged trotters in track record time at Ladbrooke at The Meadows in 1991 and the Elitloppet (world record for two heats) in 1992 in Sweden. He also set a world record on a half-mile track for aged trotting geldings winning the Provenzano Memorial at Batavia Downs.

In his career he won 39 of 62 starts, $946,762 and had a lifetime mark of 1:55.1f. He was owned and raised by Lori Ferguson (Wade) and trained by Mike Wade throughout his career. In the Elitloppet, Billyjojimbob was driven by Murray Brethour. He died on June 15, 2002, of a suspected heart attack.

He was inducted into the Canadian Horse Racing Hall of Fame in 1995.
