= Ulf Thoresen =

Norwegian harness racer

- Born: 12 February 1946; Larvik, Norway
- Died: 11 July 1992 (aged 46)
- Occupation: Harness racer

Ulf Thoresen (12 February 1946 – 11 July 1992) was a Norwegian harness racer. He was born in Larvik. He won more than 4,000 races in Norway and about 300 races abroad. He was World Champion in 1973, 1977, 1979 and 1981. He won the Hambletonian Stake in 1986 with the horse Nuclear Kosmos, won the race Oslo Grand Prix in 1976 and 1978, and Olympiatravet in 1987.
