= Björn Goop =

Swedish driver (born 1976)

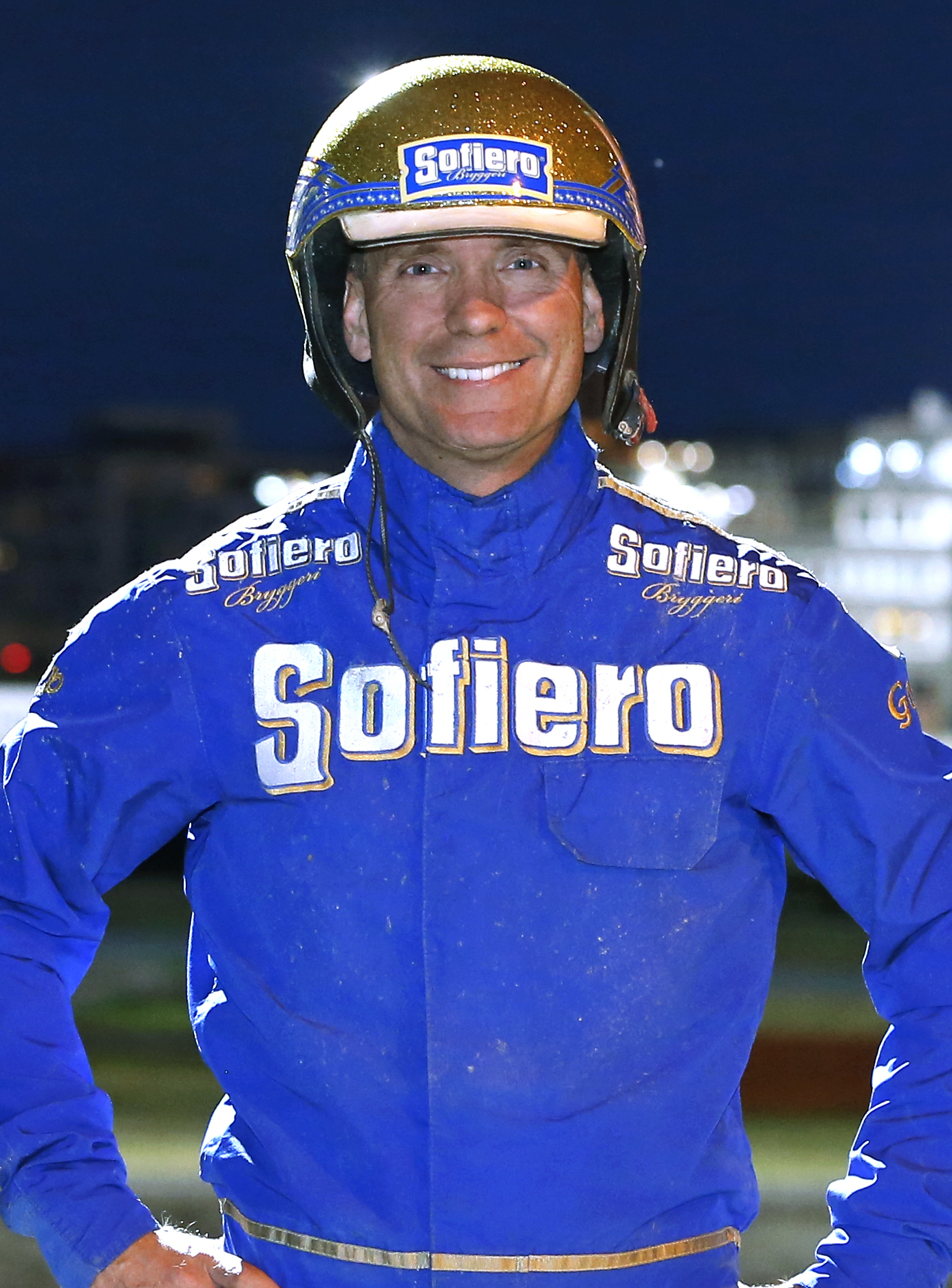
- Björn Goop 2020.
- Born: Björn Olov Goop; 13 October 1976 (age 49); Mölndal, Gothenburg Municipality, Sweden
- Occupations: Trainer, driver
- Known for: Swedish Champion (trotting) 2004–2015

Björn Olov Goop (born 13 October 1976 in Mölndal), is a Swedish trotting trainer and driver. Together with his father, Olle Goop (until his death in 2022), he runs one of Sweden's most successful training camps for trotting horses, Goop Stable, in their hometown, Kil, Värmland County.

== Career ==
Björn Goop won his first race in 1994 at Axevallatravet with the horse Scotch Ville.

Goop currently holds the Swedish record for most wins as a driver in one season (501 races, 2006). Goop has won the biggest Swedish race, Elitloppet, three times. In 2006, Goop won with the self-trained horse Conny Nobell, and in 2014 and 2017 with Timoko (trained by Richard Westerink). With Timoko, he also finished second in Prix d'Amérique in 2016. He won Prix d'Amérique 2018 with Readly Express, trained by Timo Nurmos.

=== Major wins as a driver ===
- Copenhagen Cup (2011, 2016)
- Olympiatravet (2006, 2016)
- Elitloppet (2014, 2017)
- Finlandia-Ajo (2012)
- Kymi Grand Prix (2014, 2020)
- Oslo Grand Prix (2011)
- Åby Stora Pris (2016)
- Sundsvall Open Trot (2005)
- Svenskt Travkriterium (1997)
- Stochampionatet (2000, 1997)
- Prix de France (2014, 2015)
- Prix d'Amérique (2018, 2020, 2021)

=== Major wins as a driver and trainer ===
- Svensk uppfödningslöpning 2014 with Mister J.P.
- Finlandia-Ajo 2010 with Quarcio du Chene
- Elitloppet 2006 with Conny Nobell
- Grand Prix l'UET 2005 with Conny Nobell
- Svenskt Travderby 2005 with Conny Nobell
- Svenskt Travkriterium 2004 with Conny Nobell
