= Swedish Trotting Derby =

The Swedish Trotting Derby Svenskt Travderby
- Class: Group One National
- Location: Jägersro Racetrack, Malmö, Sweden
- Inaugurated: 1928
- Race type: Harness race for standardbred trotters

Race information
- Distance: 2,640 meters (1.64 miles)
- Track: Left-handed 1,000 meter track (0.62 mile)
- Qualification: Swedish 4-year-olds
- Purse: ≈US$442,000

The Swedish Trotting Derby (Swedish: Svenskt Travderby) is an annual national Group One harness event for trotters that is held at Jägersro Racetrack in Malmö, Sweden. It is by many considered the most prestigious Swedish event for 4-year-old racing horses. The purse in the 2010 final was ≈US$442,000 (SEK 3,200,000), of which the winner, Joke Face, won half.

== Location ==
Through the years, the host of the Derby final has at times annually been Jägersro, but at times, the hostesship has altered between Jägersro, Solvalla and Åby. Since 1966, the final event has been held at Jägersro Racetrack every year.

- 1928 - 1932 Jägersro
- 1933 - 1954 Jägersro or Solvalla
- 1954 - 1965 Jägersro, Åby or Solvalla
- 1966 - Jägersro

== Entering the event ==
To enter the Swedish Trotting Derby, a horse owner is obliged to make four payments, the last approximately seven months before the final is held. In total, these payments consist of ≈US$523 (SEK4,375) as of 2009. In addition to these costs, a supplementary fee of ≈US$761 (SEK6,360) is paid to enter the elimination races 12 days before the final.

== Racing conditions ==
=== Distance ===
From the start in 1928 until 1982, the distance of the Derby was in the interval 3,000-3,200 meters. The distance was shortened to 2,640 meters (1.64 miles) in 1983, which has been the distance of the race ever since.

=== Starting method ===
The first 32 Derby finals, was started by using volt start. In 1960, auto start was introduced. Since then, a motorized starting gate has been used every year, with exceptions for 1962, 1969 and 1970.

== Past winners ==
=== Drivers with most wins ===
- 11 - Sören Nordin
- 9 - Gunnar Nordin
- 7 - Stig H. Johansson
- 5 - Gösta Nordin
- 3 - Robert Bergh

=== Trainers with most wins ===
- 11 - Sören Nordin
- 9 - Gunnar Nordin
- 7 - Stig H. Johansson
- 5 - Gösta Nordin
- 3 - Robert Bergh

=== Sires with at least two winning offsprings ===
- 3 - Scotch Nibs (Pecka Trickson, Guy Nibs, Pom Chips)
- 3 - Locomotive (Codex, Smaragd, Locomite)
- 3 - Earl's Mr Will (Isa Will, Lola Will, Willburn)
- 3 - Bulwark (Hetty, Presidenten, Architect)
- 2 - Viking Kronos (Maharajah, Joke Face)
- 2 - Alf Palema (Gazza Degato, Colombian Necktie)
- 2 - Crowntron (Sans Rival, Queen L.)
- 2 - Count's Pride (Jet Ribb, Gaston Pride)
- 2 - Tibur (Mustard, Big Spender)
- 2 - Sandy Flash (Sassa Hanover, Belle Day)
- 2 - Tulipan (Fakir, Lorry)
- 2 - Peter Pogue (Petersdotter, Peter Spjuver)
- 2 - Dreamer Boy (Ibrahim Pascha, Karina S.)

=== Winning stallions that have also sired winners ===
- Björn (1968), sire of May Björn (1979)
- Gay Noon (1953), sire of Gavin (1965)

=== Winner with lowest odds ===
- Winning odds: 1.14 - Peter Spjuver (1931)

=== Winner with highest odds ===
- Winning odds: 74.36 - Segerstorp Comet (1970)

=== Fastest winners ===
==== 2,640 meters auto start ====
- 1:12.0 (km rate) - Who's Who (2018)

==== 3,000-3,200 meters auto start ====
- 1:18.9 (km rate) - Mustard (1980)

==== 3,000-3,200 meters volt start ====
- 1:22.2 (km rate) - Galint (1969)

=== All winners of the Swedish Trotting Derby ===
| Year | Horse | Driver | Trainer | Odds of winner | Winning time (km rate) |
|---|---|---|---|---|---|
| 2019 | Attraversiamo | Erik Adielsson | Svante Båth | 5.82 | 1:12.6 |
| 2018 | Who's Who | Örjan Kihlström | Pasi Aikio | 1.77 | 1:12.0 |
| 2017 | Cyber Lane | Johan Untersteiner | Johan Untersteiner | 8.61 | 1:12.3 |
| 2016 | Readly Express | Jorma Kontio | Timo Nurmos | 1.35 | 1:12.7 |
| 2015 | Conlight Ås | Erik Adielsson | Svante Båth | 4.28 | 1:13.6 |
| 2014 | Poochai | Örjan Kihlström | Svante Båth | 9.64 | 1:12.3 |
| 2013 | Mosaique Face | Lutfi Kolgjini | Lutfi Kolgjini | 16.40 | 1:12.4 |
| 2012 | Pato | Peter Ingves | Petri Puro | 3.35 | 1:12.8 |
| 2011 | Beau Mec | Torbjörn Jansson | Timo Nurmos | 11.12 | 1:13.6 |
| 2010 | Joke Face | Erik Adielsson | Lutfi Kolgjini | 4.77 | 1:13.6 |
| 2009 | Maharajah | Örjan Kihlström | Stefan Hultman | 2.08 | 1:12.8 |
| 2008 | Sahara Dynamite | Jorma Kontio | Timo Nurmos | 1.93 | 1:13.6 |
| 2007 | Commander Crowe | Johnny Takter | Petri Puro | 2.36 | 1:14.2 |
| 2006 | Colombian Necktie | Thomas Uhrberg | Roger Walmann | 21.98 | 1:14.7 |
| 2005 | Conny Nobell | Björn Goop | Björn Goop | 2.64 | 1:14.7 |
| 2004 | Gazza Degato | Tom Horpestad | Tom Horpestad | 14.55 | 1:14.1 |
| 2003 | Tsar d'Inverne | Robert Bergh | Robert Bergh | 4.55 | 1:14.4 |
| 2002 | From Above | Örjan Kihlström | Stefan Hultman | 2.67 | 1:14.9 |
| 2001 | Hilda Zonett | Robert Bergh | Robert Bergh | 3.14 | 1:15.2 |
| 2000 | S:t Göran | Stig H. Johansson | Stig H. Johansson | 5.82 | 1:15.1 |
| 1999 | Victory Tilly | Stig H. Johansson | Stig H. Johansson | 1.64 | 1:14.7 |
| 1998 | Jolly Rocket | Per Lennartsson | Per Lennartsson | 2.33 | 1:14.2 |
| 1997 | Remington Crown | Robert Bergh | Robert Bergh | 6.14 | 1:15.9 |
| 1996 | Drewgi | Åke Svanstedt | Åke Svanstedt | 3.47 | 1:16.2 |
| 1995 | Good As Gold | Mats Rånlund | Mats Rånlund | 12.10 | 1:17.6 |
| 1994 | Zenit F. | Tommy Zackrisson | Tommy Zackrisson | 5.35 | 1:15.3 |
| 1993 | Ina Scot | Kjell P. Dahlström | Kjell P. Dahlström | 1.38 | 1:14.9 |
| 1992 | Utini | Erik Berglöf | Erik Berglöf | 23.09 | 1:16.2 |
| 1991 | Sans Rival | Erik Berglöf | Erik Berglöf | 22.23 | 1:16.7 |
| 1990 | Queen L. | Stig H. Johansson | Stig H. Johansson | 3.57 | 1:16.7 |
| 1989 | Frej Nalan | Jim Frick | Jim Frick | 20.01 | 1:16.0 |
| 1988 | Gaston Pride | Per-Olof Pettersson | Per-Olof Pettersson | 6.41 | 1:16.4 |
| 1987 | Atom Knight | Anders Lindqvist | Anders Lindqvist | 15.95 | 1:15.6 |
| 1986 | Jet Ribb | Per-Erik Eriksson | Hans G. Eriksson | 3.59 | 1:16.8 |
| 1985 | Big Spender | Berth Johansson | Berth Johansson | 1.81 | 1:16.7 |
| 1984 | Big Star | Stig H. Johansson | Stig H. Johansson | 2.47 | 1:16.4 |
| 1983 | Micko Fripé | Bo W. Takter | Bo W. Takter | 2.56 | 1:18.0 |
| 1982 | Rex Håleryd | Stig H. Johansson | Stig H. Johansson | 3.72 | 1:19.5 |
| 1981 | Nino Blazing | Stig H. Nilsson | Björn Lindblom | 10.64 | 1:19.7 |
| 1980 | Mustard | Sören Nordin | Sören Nordin | 1.35 | 1:18.9 |
| 1979 | May Björn | Sven-Gunnar Johansson | Alf Lindholm | 28.19 | 1:20.3 |
| 1978 | Spinoon | Olle Lindqvist | Olle Lindqvist | 4.41 | 1:20.5 |
| 1977 | Express Gaxe | Gunnar Axelryd | Gunnar Axelryd | 1.87 | 1:19.7 |
| 1976 | Cal Min | Olle Lindqvist | Olle Lindqvist | 4.96 | 1:20.9 |
| 1975 | Opal H. | Gunnar Nordin | Gunnar Nordin | 1.79 | 1:20.2 |
| 1974 | Grain | Stig H. Johansson | Stig H. Johansson | 2.08 | 1:20.5 |
| 1973 | Pom Chips | Sören Nordin | Sören Nordin | 6.51 | 1:21.0 |
| 1972 | Ocos | Sören Nordin | Sören Nordin | 1.64 | 1:20.9 |
| 1971 | Najo | Rune Johansson | Rune Johansson | 5.06 | 1:22.2 |
| 1970 | Segerstorp Comet | Stig H. Johansson | Stig H. Johansson | 74.36 | 1:22.8 |
| 1969 | Galint | Sören Nordin | Sören Nordin | 1.98 | 1:22.2 |
| 1968 | Björn | Birger Bengtsson | Birger Bengtsson | 5.40 | 1:22.5 |
| 1967 | Guy Nibs | Karl Gösta Fylking | Håkan Wallner | 4.40 | 1:22.9 |
| 1966 | Blixt | Bruno Svensson | Bruno Svensson | 5.54 | 1:22.9 |
| 1965 | Gavin | Gösta Nordin | Gösta Nordin | 2.71 | 1:23.0 |
| 1964 | Pecka Trickson | Gunnar Nordin | Gunnar Nordin | 1.70 | 1:23.5 |
| 1963 | Sailor | Gunnar Nordin | Gunnar Nordin | 21.82 | 1:23.9 |
| 1962 | Julienne | Sören Nordin | Sören Nordin | 1.32 | 1:26.2 |
| 1961 | Stepdaughter | Uno Swed | Uno Swed | 4.18 | 1:21.5 |
| 1960 | Clementz | Sören Nordin | Sören Nordin | 1.89 | 1:24.3 |
| 1959 | Locomite | Gunnar Nordin | Gunnar Nordin | 1.35 | 1:22.4 |
| 1958 | Ilotar | Sören Nordin | Sören Nordin | 13.42 | 1:23.4 |
| 1957 | Willburn | Gunnar Nordin | Gunnar Nordin | 3.69 | 1:25.9 |
| 1956 | Architect | Gunnar Nordin | Gunnar Nordin | 13.45 | 1:23.1 |
| 1955 | Smaragd | Sören Nordin | Sören Nordin | 1.75 | 1:24.9 |
| 1954 | Codex | Sören Nordin | Sören Nordin | 1.24 | 1:24.3 |
| 1953 | Gay Noon | Gunnar Nordin | Gunnar Nordin | 1.45 | 1:23.0 |
| 1952 | Lola Will | Gunnar Nordin | Gunnar Nordin | 3.08 | 1:23.7 |
| 1951 | Madame Song | Sören Nordin | Sören Nordin | 1.50 | 1:25.5 |
| 1950 | Isa Will | Olof Persson | Olof Persson | 32.42 | 1:26.3 |
| 1949 | Presidenten | Folke Bengtsson | Folke Bengtsson | 2.24 | 1:24.1 |
| 1948 | King Brodde | Ture Persson | Ture Persson | 1.39 | 1:27.5 |
| 1947 | Belle Day | Sören Nordin | Sören Nordin | 7.55 | 1:24.5 |
| 1946 | Miss Scovere | Gösta Nordin | Gösta Nordin | 5.66 | 1:27.1 |
| 1945 | Hetty | Gösta Nordin | Gösta Nordin | 11.72 | 1:23.7 |
| 1944 | Fänrik Scott | Carl A. Schoug | Carl A. Schoug | 1.38 | 1:26.8 |
| 1943 | Lime Abbey | Gunnar Nordin | Gunnar Nordin | 1.77 | 1:24.9 |
| 1942 | Etawah Asa | Hans Ringström | Hans Ringström | 1.79 | 1:26.3 |
| 1941 | Giant Killer | Gösta Nordin | Gösta Nordin | 2.26 | 1:27.0 |
| 1940 | Golden Wedding | Sixten Lundgren | Sixten Lundgren | 1.84 | 1:26.1 |
| 1939 | Queen Nedworthy | Ragnar Thorngren | Ragnar Thorngren | 6.01 | 1:25.6 |
| 1938 | Respekt | Hugo Andersson | Hugo Andersson | 5.08 | 1:26.4 |
| 1937 | Rosenella | Gösta Nordin | Gösta Nordin | 2.83 | 1:30.2 |
| 1936 | Sassa Hanover | Fritz Mahler | Fritz Mahler | 1.60 | 1:28.6 |
| 1935 | Princess Hollyrood | Oskar Persson | Oskar Persson | 14.10 | 1:30.8 |
| 1934 | Etta June | Gotthard Ericsson | Gotthard Ericsson | 1.38 | 1:32.0 |
| 1933 | Lorry | Theodor Bilcik | Sixten Lundgren | 1.77 | 1:29.6 |
| 1932 | Fakir | Sixten Lundgren | Sixten Lundgren | 2.46 | 1:34.3 |
| 1931 | Peter Spjuver | Anton Fyhr | Anton Fyhr | 1.14 | 1:36.7 |
| 1930 | Petersdotter | Anton Fyhr | Anton Fyhr | 2.91 | 1:40.7 |
| 1929 | Karina S. | Sophus Sörensen | Sophus Sörensen | 1.34 | 1:41.6 |
| 1928 | Ibrahim Pascha | Sophus Sörensen | Sophus Sörensen | 1.59 | 1:30.9 |

== See also ==
- List of Scandinavian harness horse races
