= European Trotting Union =

Union Europeenne du Trot
- Formation: 1973
- Type: Sports federation
- Headquarters: The country of the General Secretariat
- Members: 18 national federations
- Official language: French, English
- President: Marjaana Alaviuhkola
- Website: uet-trot.net

The European Trotting Union also known by its acronym, UET for Union Europeenne du Trot is the governing body of European trotting. The federations main purpose "is the promotion of trotting races and horse breeding in Europe as well as their integrity and prestige in the world". Its headquarters are in the country of the General Secretariat and the federation's current president is Marjaana Alaviuhkola. UET has 18 member associations.

== History ==
Before 1973 there were two European trotting federations, the Continental Trotting Union (UCT) and the International Trotting Racing Union (UICT). In 1972, the two unions decided to form one joint federation, UET. Upon the formation in 1973, Pierre de Montesson of France became the first president of UET.

== Member countries ==
Member countries

UET has 18 member associations. Austria, Belgium, Denmark, France, Germany, Italy, The Netherlands, Norway and Sweden were the founding members in 1973. Since then have Finland (1974), Switzerland (1975), Spain (1977), Malta (1991), Czech Republic (1998), Slovenia (2005), Estonia (2006), Russia (2006) and Hungary (2008) joined the European Trotting Union.

== Functions ==
UET's above-mentioned purpose, to promote "trotting races and horse breeding in Europe as well as their integrity and prestige in the world" is carried out through different methods. The organization tries to establish rules that are common to trotting in all Europe. It arranges events and aims to make sure that big races on different tracks do not overlap. Furthermore, UET claims to work against both doping and gambling problems.

== Events arranged by UET ==
=== UET Grand Prix ===
UET Grand Prix (Grand Prix de l'UET), also called the European Trotting Derby, is an event for European-born, four-year-old stallions and mares. According to UET, the events aim is to encourage breeding. The 2009 UET Grand Prix has a €460,000 purse.

=== 3-year-old European Championship ===
This championship is a race between 3-year-old European trotters (not geldings) that have been chosen to represent their different countries by the countries' national federations. The 3-year-old European Championship was created in 1984 and the 2009 edition has a purse of €150,000.

=== 5-year-old European Championship ===
The 5-year-old European Championship was created in 1967. The competing horses are picked by their national federations. Geldings are not allowed to race in the championship. The 2009 5-year-old European Championship has a purse of €100,000.

=== European Grand Circuit and UET Masters Series ===
The European Grand Circuit was a series of Group I races taking place in UET countries during a year. It was replaced by the UET Masters Series in 2012.

=== European Championship for apprentices ===
The national federations choose apprentices to represent their countries. The competition was founded in 1986.

=== European Championship for drivers ===
The most-winning drivers of the UET countries face each other in this event, which was established in 1969. It is held every two years, in alteration with the world driving championship.
