= Elitloppet =

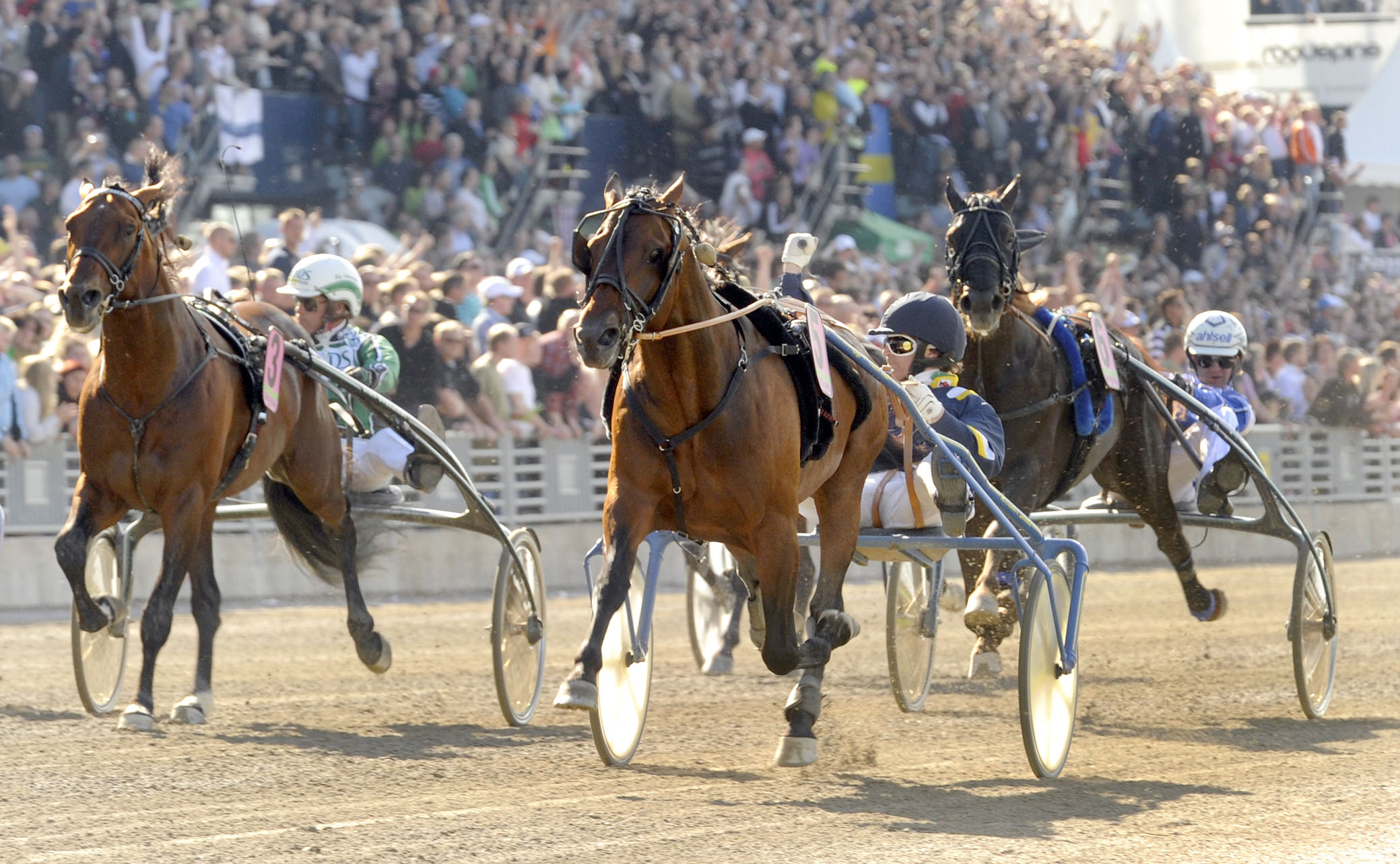
- 2010 Elitloppet finish-line
- Class: Group One International
- Location: Solvalla Racetrack, Stockholm, Sweden
- Inaugurated: 1952
- Race type: Harness race for standardbred trotters
- Website: elitloppet.se

Race information
- Distance: 1,609 meters (1 mile)
- Track: Left-handed 1,000 meter track (0.62 mile)
- Qualification: Invitational
- Purse: SEK 11,350,000 ≈USD 1,073,000

Elitloppet (literally: "The Elite Race") or Solvallas Internationella Elitlopp is an annual, invitational Group One harness event that has taken place at Solvalla Racetrack in Stockholm, Sweden, since 1952. The competition is regarded as one of the most prestigious international events in trotting. The winner is decided through two qualifying rounds and a subsequent final later the same day. Both the eliminations and the final are raced over the mile. The overall purse for the 2022 event was SEK11,350,000, equalling approximately US$1,073,000. In 2002 the Italian champion Varenne, (considered the strongest trotter of all time), took it in a world record time of 1:10.4 in the elimination and then bested that mark by winning the final in 1:10.2 – the fastest mile ever trotted around three turns. The fastest winning time in a final is 1:08.0, run by the French Horsy Dream in 2024. Elitloppet was part of the European Grand Circuit and is part of that circuit's successor, the UET Masters Series.

== History ==
=== The beginning ===
The first Elitloppet was run in 1952 under the name of Solvallas Jubileumslopp (approximately "Solvalla's Jubilee Race"). Winner the opening year was the German horse Permit. The following year, the event changed name to Elitloppet.

=== The doping affair in 2006 ===
In Elitloppet 2006, French star trotter Jag de Bellouet won in a record time of 1:09,4 (km rate), with Italian Lets Go in second place. At a press conference a few weeks after the Elitloppet Day, it was announced that both horses had been disqualified due to positive doping tests. Jag de Bellouet and Lets Go tested positive for diclofenac and etacrynic acid, respectively. After the disqualifications, Swedish Conny Nobell was announced the official winner of the 2006 event. The general secretary in the Swedish Trotting Association (STC), Ulf Hörnberg, expressed that the double disqualifications was a "tragedy" for the event.

=== The Propulsion scandal ===
Propulsion is a stallion that was imported from the United States 2015 to race in Sweden for trainer Daniel Redén. The USTA (United States Trotting Association) sent an export certificate to Svensk Travsport (The Swedish trotting association). Prior to being imported Propulsion had been nerved and according to Swedish regulations no nerved horse is allowed to race or participate in breeding. It was indicated in the export certificate that the horse was nerved but this was never spotted by Svensk Travsport. The horse was allowed to race and won over 30 million SEK in prize money. In 2020 the horse had never won Elitloppet and participated for the fifth time. In the elimination heat he finished third. Due to his trip in the race his performance was considered very impressive. In the final, Propulsion crossed the finish line first. Two days after Propulsion's victory the Norwegian magazine Trav-og Galopp-nytt published an article claiming to have evidence that Propulsion was nerved and Svensk Travsport opened an investigation into the matter. On 29 October 2020 Svensk Travsport announced that Propulsion was racing in violation of the rules and he was thus stripped of all his results in Sweden. No decision has been made concerning Propulsion's results in other European countries. The matter has now been handed over to STAD (Svenskt Travsports Ansvars-och Disciplinnämnd, literally "Liability and Disciplinary committee of Svensk Travsport") to determine if any sanctions should be handed out. The lawyer of Svensk Travsport, Göran Wahlman said that Daniel Redén did not intentionally violate the rules but, as the trainer, he is strictly liable.

== Racing conditions ==
=== The races ===
In 1952–1958 and in 1973, Elitloppet was decided through two heats followed by a race-off if not one and the same horse won both heats. In 1959–1961, when a longer distance was trotted, only a single race was run. Since 1962 (with the exception of 1973), a concept of two eliminations and one final has been used. The number of horses in the eliminations has varied from seven to twelve during these years, but there have always been eight trotters in the final.

=== Distance ===
The distance has, with the exception of the years 1959–1961, been in the interval of 1,580–1,640 meters. In 1959, the horses ran 3,200 meters, and the two following years, the distance was approximately 2,700 meters.

=== Starting method ===
During the first ten years, 1952–1961, volt start was used in Elitloppet. From 1962 and on, a motorized starting gate has been used, changing the starting method from volt start to auto start.

== The Elitloppet weekend ==
Elitloppet is traditionally raced on the last Sunday of May. Solvalla stages races both Saturday and Sunday which makes up a meet, known in Sweden as "The Elitloppet weekend" (Swedish: Elitloppshelgen). The two days are generally well-visited and is considered one of Sweden's biggest sports events. In 2008, a total of over 53,000 people attended the events at Solvalla.

== Past winners ==
=== Horses with most wins ===
- 2 - Timoko (2014, 2017)
- 2 - Varenne (2001, 2002)
- 2 - Copiad (1994, 1995)
- 2 - Mack Lobell (1988, 1990)
- 2 - Ideal du Gazeau (1980, 1982)
- 2 - Timothy T. (1974, 1975)
- 2 - Eileen Eden (1968, 1970)
- 2 - Roquepine (1966, 1967)
- 2 - Gelinotte (1956, 1957)

=== Sires with at least two winning offspring ===
- 2 - Quick Pay (The Onion, Victory Tilly)
- 2 - Andover Hall (Nuncio, Magic Tonight)
- 2 - Alf Palema (Gidde Palema, Torvald Palema)
- 2 - Bulwark (Frances Bulwark, Carné)
- 2 - Epilog (Eidelstedter, Permit)
- 2 - Hoot Mon (Pack Hanover, Dart Hanover)
- 2 - Kerjacques (Eleazar, Jorky)
- 2 - Speedy Crown (Gum Ball, Moni Maker)

=== Sires who won and sired a winner ===
- Timoko (Etonnant)

=== Drivers with most wins ===
- 6 - Stig H. Johansson (1984, 1987, 1989, 1991, 1997, 2000)
- 4 - Johannes Frömming (1962, 1965, 1968, 1970)
- 4 - Örjan Kihlström (2003,2015,2016,2021)
- 3 - Leopold Verroken (1976, 1977, 1981)
- 3 - Björn Goop (2006,2014,2017)

=== Countries, number of wins ===
- 27 – France
- 25 – Sweden
- 10 – Italy
- 5 – Germany combined with West Germany
- 3 – United States
- 2 – Norway
- 2 – Canada

=== Fastest winners ===
==== Short distance (1,600-1,609 m), auto start (1962-) ====
- 1:08.0 (km rate) - Horsy Dream (2024)

==== Short distance (1,580-1,640 m), volt start (1952-1958) ====
- 1:16.7 (km rate) - Gelinotte (1956)

==== Long distance (2,700-3,200 m), volt start (1959-1961) ====
- 1:19.1 (km rate) - Honoré II (1960)

=== All winners of Elitloppet ===
Year	Horse	Driver	Country^{1}	Odds of winner	Winning time
1952	Permit	Walter Heitman	West Germany	2.16	1:17.3
1953	Frances Bulwark	Sören Nordin	Sweden	2.25	1:20.6
1954	Carné	Olle Persson	Sweden	8.65	1:18.7
1955	Gutemberg A.	Alain Deheeger	France	9.85	1:18.9
1956	Gelinotte	Charlie Mills	France	1.24	1:16.7
1957	Gelinotte	Charlie Mills	France	1.67	1:16.8
1958	Io d'Amour	Gerhard Krüger	West Germany	1.25	1:18.4o
1959	Jamin	Jean Riaud	France	1.21	1:21.1
1960	Honoré II	Raoul Simonard	France	21.04	1:19.1
1961	Kracovie	Roger Vercruysse	France	3.34	1:20.3
1962	Eidelstedter	Johannes Frömming	West Germany	4.65	1:17.4
1963	Ozo	Roger Massue	France	1.31	1:16.5
1964	Pack Hanover	Sergio Brighenti	Italy	4.39	1:15.4
1965	Elma	Johannes Frömming	United States	1.42	1:16.5
1966	Roquepine	Henri Levesque	France	3.24	1:15.3
1967	Roquepine	Henri Levesque	France	1.38	1:15.1
1968	Eileen Eden	Johannes Frömming	Italy	1.30	1:15.8
1969	Fresh Yankee	Joe O'Brien	Canada	2.67	1:15.8
1970	Eileen Eden	Johannes Frömming	Italy	21.12	1:15.5
1971	Tidalium Pelo	Jean Mary	France	1.80	1:14.7
1972	Dart Hanover	Berndt Lindstedt	United States	1.27	1:15.3
1973	Ego Boy	Ingemar Olofsson	Sweden	2.03	1:23.8
1974	Timothy T.	Giancarlo Baldi	Italy	2.70	1:15.7
1975	Timothy T.	Giancarlo Baldi	Italy	2.81	1:17.2
1976	Dimitria	Leopold Verroken	France	2.47	1:15.8
1977	Eleazar	Leopold Verroken	France	3.55	1:16.0
1978	Hadol du Vivier	Jean Rene Gougeon	France	2.56	1:14.0
1979	Pershing	Berndt Lindstedt	Sweden	1.71	1:13.7
1980	Ideal du Gazeau	Eugène Lefèvre	France	3.05	1:13.8
1981	Jorky	Leopold Verroken	France	3.65	1:13.2
1982	Ideal du Gazeau	Eugène Lefèvre	France	2.06	1:13.2
1983	Ianthin	Paul Delanoe	France	4.15	1:13.2
1984	The Onion	Stig H. Johansson	Sweden	2.34	1:12.2
1985	Meadow Road	Torbjörn Jansson	Sweden	5.72	1:11.6
1986	Rex Rodney	Kjell Håkonsen	Norway	1.51	1:13.4
1987	Utah Bulwark	Stig H. Johansson	Sweden	6.31	1:12.1
1988	Mack Lobell	John D. Campbell	United States	1.52	1:11.3
1989	Napoletano	Stig H. Johansson	United States	1.57	1:12.8
1990	Mack Lobell	Thomas Nilsson	United States	1.59	1:11.0
1991	Peace Corps	Stig H. Johansson	United States	1.41	1:12.2
1992	Billyjojimbob	Murray Brethour	Canada	2.40	1:11.8
1993	Sea Cove	Joseph Verbeeck	Canada	2.51	1:11.9
1994	Copiad	Erik Berglöf	Sweden	2.38	1:11.8
1995	Copiad	Erik Berglöf	Sweden	1.39	1:11.3
1996	Coktail Jet	Jean-Etienne Dubois	France	4.33	1:11.4
1997	Gum Ball	Stig H. Johansson	Sweden	4.95	1:12.3
1998	Moni Maker	Wally Hennessey	United States	2.20	1:10.6
1999	Remington Crown	Joseph Verbeeck	France	4.10	1:12.6
2000	Victory Tilly	Stig H. Johansson	Sweden	3.10	1:10.5
2001	Varenne	Giampaolo Minnucci	Italy	1.47	1:10.7
2002	Varenne	Giampaolo Minnucci	Italy	1.32	1:10.2
2003	From Above	Örjan Kihlström	Sweden	9.44	1:10.1
2004	Gidde Palema	Åke Svanstedt	Sweden	1.34	1:10.0
2005	Steinlager	Per Oleg Midfjeld	Norway	1.86	1:10.0
2006	Conny Nobell	Björn Goop	Sweden	4.18	1:09.9
2007	L'Amiral Mauzun	Jean-Michel Bazire	France	5.29	1:10.0
2008	Exploit Caf	Jean-Michel Bazire	Italy	1.78	1:09.8
2009	Torvald Palema	Åke Svanstedt	Sweden	4.86	1:10.4
2010	Iceland	Johnny Takter	Sweden	8.92	1:10.5
2011	Brioni	Joakim Lövgren	Germany	27.06	1:10.5
2012	Commander Crowe	Christophe Martens	Sweden	3.01	1:10.4
2013	Nahar	Robert Bergh	Sweden	5.48	1:10.1
2014	Timoko	Björn Goop	France	2.94	1:09.5
2015	Magic Tonight	Örjan Kihlström	Sweden	4.35	1:10.1
2016	Nuncio	Örjan Kihlström	Sweden	3.10	1:09.2
2017	Timoko	Björn Goop	France	30.89	1:09.0
2018	Ringostarr Treb	Wilhelm Paal	Italy	3.47	1:09.0
2019	Dijon	Romain Derieux	France	27.78	1:10.3
2020	Cokstile	Christoffer Eriksson	Italy	4.38	1:10.4
2021	Don Fanucci Zet	Örjan Kihlström	Sweden	3.79	1:08.9
2022	Etonnant	Anthony Barrier	France	10.18	1:09.3
2023	Hohneck	Gabriele Gelormini	France	7.69	1:08.9
2024	Horsy Dream	Eric Raffin	France	3.81	1:08.0
2025	Go On Boy	Romain Derieux	France	3.35	1:08.4
2026	Allegiant	Örjan Kihlström	Sweden	8.98	1:07.1

^{1} Nationality of the winning horse's owner(s)

== See also ==
- Harness racing in Sweden
- List of Scandinavian harness horse races
