= Hugo Åbergs Memorial =

- Class: Group One International
- Location: Jägersro Racetrack, Malmö, Sweden
- Inaugurated: 1970
- Race type: Harness race for standardbred trotters

Race information
- Distance: 1,609 meters (1 mile)
- Track: Left-handed 1,000 meter track (0.62 mile)
- Qualification: Invitational
- Purse: ≈US$291,000

Hugo Åbergs Memorial is an annual Group One harness event for trotters that is held at Jägersro Racetrack in Malmö, Sweden. Hugo Åbergs Memorial has taken place since 1970. In 2008, the purse of the event was approximately US$291,000 (SEK1,750,000). Hugo Åbergs Memorial is part of the European Grand Circuit.

== Origin ==
Hugo Åbergs Memorial was inaugurated in 1970 to commemorate Hugo Åberg, who had died in a car accident the previous year. Åberg was a significant building contractor, responsible for many building projects in Malmö, as well as a horse racing devotee.

== Racing conditions ==
Since the start in 1970, Hugo Åbergs Memorial has been almost exclusively over 1,609 meters, one mile. The two exceptions are the editions of 1971 and 1972, when the race was nine meters shorter, i.e. 1,600 meters. Auto start has been used all years but 1971 and 1977, when volt start was used instead.

The event is invitational, meaning only invited horses can participate.

== Past winners ==
=== Horses with most wins ===
- 2 - Express Gaxe (1979, 1980)
- 2 - Big Spender (1986, 1987)
- 2 - Peace Corps (1990, 1991)
- 2 - Rite On Line (1997, 1998)
- 2 - Gidde Palema (2004, 2005)

=== Drivers with most wins ===
- 7 - Stig H. Johansson
- 3 - Åke Svanstedt
- 2 - Jean-Michel Bazire
- 2 - Olle Goop
- 2 - Per-Olof Gustafsson
- 2 - Atle Hamre
- 2 - Berth Johansson

=== Trainers with most wins ===
- 8 - Stig H. Johansson
- 3 - Åke Svanstedt
- 2 - Per-Olof Gustafsson
- 2 - Atle Hamre
- 2 - Berth Johansson

=== Sires with at least two winning offsprings ===
- 3 - Tibur (Mustard, Big Spender, Callit)
- 2 - Biesolo (Giesolo de Lou, Oiseau de Feux)
- 2 - Nevele Pride (Pershing, U.S. Thor Viking)
- 2 - Quick Pay (The Onion, Victory Tilly)

=== Winner with lowest odds ===
- Winning odds: 1.07 - Varenne (2002)

=== Winner with highest odds ===
- Winning odds: 43.17 - Atout du Moulin (1971)

=== Fastest winners ===
==== Auto start ====
- 1:09.7 (km rate) - L'Amiral Mauzun (2008)

==== Volt start ====
- 1:16.3 (km rate) - Duke Iran (1977)

=== All winners of Hugo Åbergs Memorial ===
Year	Horse	Driver	Trainer	Odds of winner	Winning time (km rate)
2008	L'Amiral Mauzun	Jean-Michel Bazire	Jean-Philippe Ducher	2.17	1:09.7
2007	Oiseau de Feux	Jean-Michel Bazire	Fabrice Souloy	33.07	1:10.9
2006	Citation	Erik Adielsson	Stig H. Johansson	7.01	1:11.0
2005	Gidde Palema	Åke Svanstedt	Åke Svanstedt	2.61	1:10.9
2004	Gidde Palema	Åke Svanstedt	Åke Svanstedt	3.27	1:11.2
2003	Revenue	Lutfi Kolgjini	Lutfi Kolgjini	2.19	1:10.5
2002	Varenne	Giampaolo Minnucci	Jori Turja	1.07	1:10.9
2001	Giesolo de Lou	Jean-Etienne Dubois	Jean-Etienne Dubois	9.01	1:11.0
2000	Victory Tilly	Stig H. Johansson	Stig H. Johansson	2.34	1:10.7
1999	Fridhems Ambra	Stefan Söderqvist	Ove Ousbäck	6.77	1:11.2
1998	Rite On Line	Atle Hamre	Atle Hamre	13.57	1:12.4
1997	Rite On Line	Atle Hamre	Atle Hamre	7.27	1:11.0
1996	Zoogin	Åke Svanstedt	Åke Svanstedt	2.19	1:11.5
1995	Houston Laukko	Jorma Kontio	Pekka Yli-Houhala	12.58	1:11.5
1994	Campo Ass	Heinz Wewering	Heinz Wewering	38.55	1:11.2
1993	Sea Cove	Joseph Verbeeck	Harald Grendel	2.97	1:11.8
1992	Kosar	Stig H. Johansson	Stig H. Johansson	3.64	1:12.2
1991	Peace Corps	Stig H. Johansson	Stig H. Johansson	1.26	1:12.3
1990	Peace Corps	Stig H. Johansson	Stig H. Johansson	1.47	1:13.0
1989	Mack Lobell	Veijo Heiskanen	John-Erik Magnusson	1.31	1:12.1
1988	Callit	Karl O. Johansson	Karl O. Johansson	8.76	1:12.4
1987	Big Spender	Berth Johansson	Berth Johansson	9.04	1:13.6
1986	Big Spender	Berth Johansson	Berth Johansson	5.04	1:14.7
1985	Matiné	Johnny Takter	Bo W. Takter	4.62	1:13.8
1984	The Onion	Stig H. Johansson	Stig H. Johansson	1.44	1:12.3
1983	Speedy Magnus	Olle Goop	Arne Bernhardsson	3.94	1:13.9
1982	U.S. Thor Viking	Stig H. Johansson	Stig H. Johansson	9.18	1:13.8
1981	Mustard	Olle Goop	Ulf Nordin	11.43	1:14.2
1980	Express Gaxe	Gunnar Axelryd	Gunnar Axelryd	1.78	1:13.5
1979	Express Gaxe	Gunnar Axelryd	Gunnar Axelryd	6.03	1:15.3
1978	Pershing	Berndt Lindstedt	Berndt Lindstedt	2.61	1:15.3
1977	Duke Iran	Stig H. Johansson	Stig H. Johansson	1.58/1.78	1:16.3/1:16.6
1976	Nick Scott	Uno Swed	Uno Swed	8.55	1:17.9
1975	Judy Song	Per-Olof Gustafsson	Per-Olof Gustafsson	5.06	1:18.7
1974	Molnets Broder	Åke Sundberg	Åke Sundberg	1.84	1:15.8
1973	Ego Boy	Ingemar Olofsson	Ingemar Olofsson	1.12	1:16.3
1972	Noble Action	Sören Nordin	Sören Nordin	1.42	1:15.9
1971	Atout du Moulin	Gert Scherman	Gert Scherman	43.17/3.35	1:17.6/1:20.6
1970	Brogan	Per-Olof Gustafsson	Per-Olof Gustafsson	1.55	1:17.7

== See also ==
- List of Scandinavian harness horse races
