= Olle Goop =

Swedish horse racer (1943–2022)

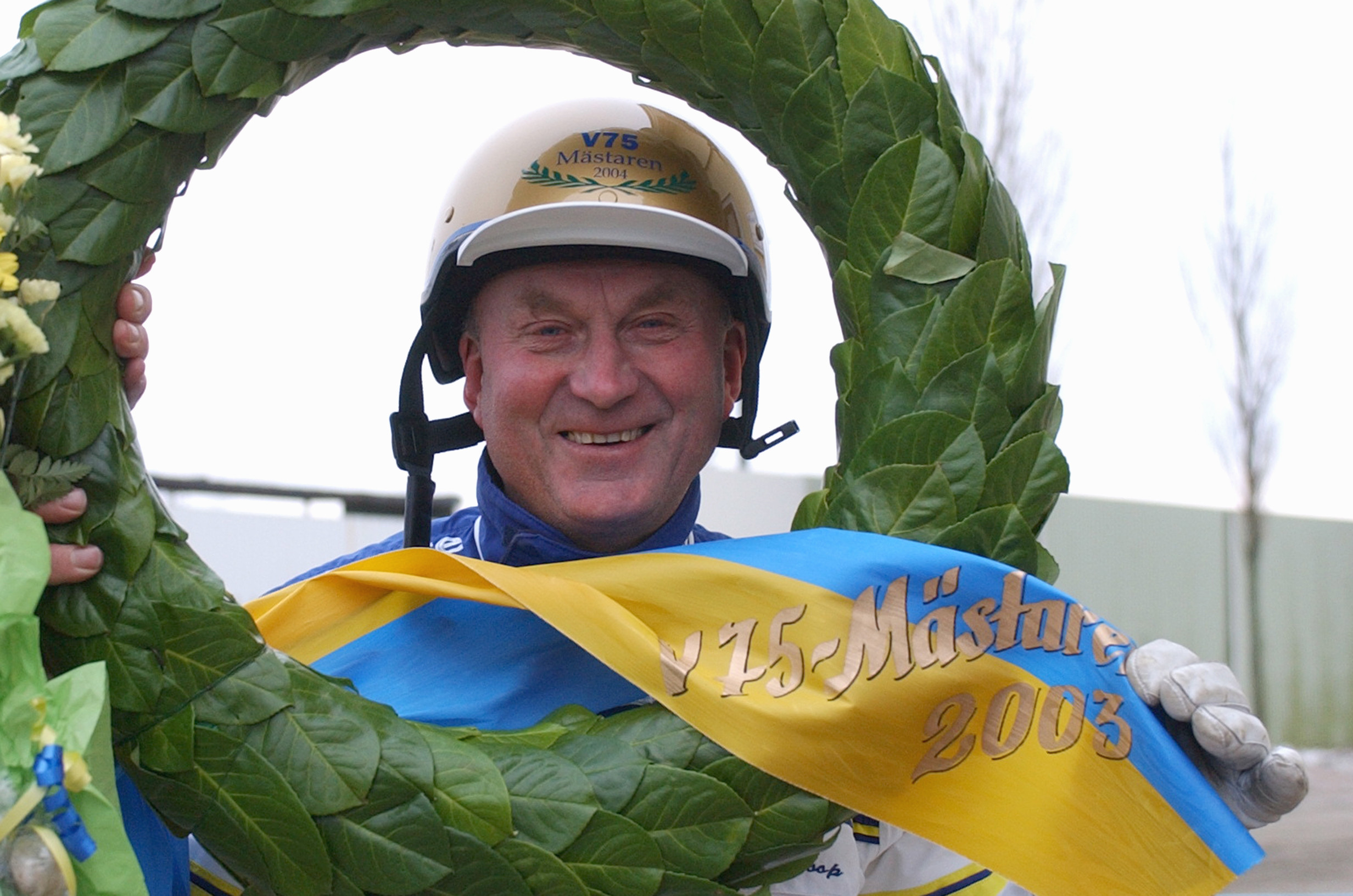
- Goop in 2013
- Born: Per Olov Goop; 13 August 1943; Mora, Sweden
- Died: 20 April 2022 (aged 78)
- Children: Björn Goop

Per Olov "Olle" Goop (13 August 1943 – 20 April 2022) was a Swedish trotting driver and trainer who specialised in harness racing.

Goop died on 20 April 2022, at the age of 78.

He was for a long time the most victorious driver from Sweden of all time with 6 744 wins. His son Björn Goop took over the title from his father 2018.
