= Plesac =

Plesac is a surname. Notable people with the surname include:

- Dan Plesac (born 1962), American baseball player
- Zach Plesac (born 1995), American baseball player, nephew of Dan
