= Gidde Palema =

Swedish Standardbred racehorse

- Breed: Standardbred
- Sire: Alf Palema
- Grandsire: Speedy Somolli
- Dam: Rosie Palema
- Maternal grandsire: Ideal du Gazeau
- Sex: Stallion
- Foaled: 9 April 1995
- Country: Sweden
- Colour: Bay
- Breeder: Karl-Erik Bender
- Owner: Stall Palema
- Trainer: Åke Svanstedt

Record
- 93: 44-21-8

Earnings
- US$3,526,263

Major wins
- Olympiatravet (Sweden) (2003, 2004, 2005); Oslo Grand Prix (Norway) (2003, 2004); Copenhagen Cup (Denmark) (2003); Jubileumspokalen (Sweden) (2003, 2004, 2005); Åby Stora Pris (Sweden) (2003, 2005); Elitloppet (Sweden) (2004); Hugo Åbergs Memorial (Sweden) (2004, 2005)
- Last updated on: 2009-02-02.

Gidde Palema (born 9 April 1995) is a Swedish Standardbred breeding stallion and former racing trotter by Alf Palema out of Rosie Palema by Ideal du Gazeau.

His most prestigious victories include Oslo Grand Prix (2003, 2004), Copenhagen Cup (2003) and Elitloppet (2004). At the end of his career, the stallion had earned US$3,526,263 (€2,901,135).

== Pedigree ==
Pedigree of Gidde Palema (Sweden)
Sire Alf Palema (United States)	Speedy Somolli (United States)	Speedy Crown (United States)	Speedy Scot (United States)
Sire Alf Palema (United States)	Speedy Somolli (United States)	Speedy Crown (United States)	Missile Toe (United States)
Sire Alf Palema (United States)	Speedy Somolli (United States)	Somolli (United States)	Star's Pride (United States)
Sire Alf Palema (United States)	Speedy Somolli (United States)	Somolli (United States)	Laureta Hanover (United States)
Sire Alf Palema (United States)	Highland Bridget (United States)	Super Bowl (United States)	Star's Pride (United States)
Sire Alf Palema (United States)	Highland Bridget (United States)	Super Bowl (United States)	Pillow Talk (United States)
Sire Alf Palema (United States)	Highland Bridget (United States)	Highland Maiden (United States)	Speedy Scot (United States)
Sire Alf Palema (United States)	Highland Bridget (United States)	Highland Maiden (United States)	Princess Martha (United States)
Dam Rosie Palema (Sweden)	Ideal du Gazeau (France)	Alexis III (France)	Narioca (France)
Dam Rosie Palema (Sweden)	Ideal du Gazeau (France)	Alexis III (France)	Olga II (France)
Dam Rosie Palema (Sweden)	Ideal du Gazeau (France)	Venise du Gazeau (France)	Loiron D. (France)
Dam Rosie Palema (Sweden)	Ideal du Gazeau (France)	Venise du Gazeau (France)	Paquerette II (France)
Dam Rosie Palema (Sweden)	Haha Arden (United States)	Florlis (United States)	Florican (United States)
Dam Rosie Palema (Sweden)	Haha Arden (United States)	Florlis (United States)	Mighty Phyllis (United States)
Dam Rosie Palema (Sweden)	Haha Arden (United States)	Mirthful (United States)	Rodney (United States)
Dam Rosie Palema (Sweden)	Haha Arden (United States)	Mirthful (United States)	Mimi Hanover (United States)
