= Song Huai-Kuei =

Song Huai-Kuei (Chinese: 宋怀桂; 7 December 1937 – 21 March 2006), also known as Madame Song, was a Chinese artist, actor, fashion icon, socialite, and businesswoman. She is seen as having been instrumental in introducing China to an international fashion and lifestyle scene at a time when it was largely isolated from the rest of the world.

Song was married to Bulgarian tapestry artist Marin Varbanov (1932-1989) and worked as fashion designer Pierre Cardin's agent in Beijing during the 1980s.

== Life and career ==
Song studied at the Central Academy of Fine Arts (CAFA) in Beijing. This is also where she met Varbanov, who was part of a group of exchange students, in 1954. They married in December 1956 - the first mixed marriage in the People's Republic of China. Song and Varbanov moved to Sofia, Bulgaria in 1959, where they worked as artists.

Song met Italian-French fashion designer Pierre Cardin in 1979 in Paris, and started working for him to launch his brand in Beijing. In 1980, she moved back to Beijing and worked full-time for Cardin. She helped to open the restaurant Maxim's de Paris in Beijing and served as its manager for two decades.

In 1987, Song played the mother of Pu Yi in The Last Emperor.

Song had two children, Boryana and Phénix Varbanov.
