= Oslo Grand Prix =

- Class: Group One International
- Location: Bjerke Racetrack; Oslo, Norway
- Inaugurated: 1966
- Race type: Harness race for standardbred trotters
- Website: www.bjerke.no/Oslo-Grand-Prix

Race information
- Distance: 2,100 meters (1.31 mile)
- Track: Left-handed 1,000 meter track (0.62 mile)
- Qualification: Invitational
- Purse: ≈US$427,000 (NOK 2.87 million, ≈€308,000)

Oslo Grand Prix is an annual Group One harness event that takes place at Bjerke Racetrack in Oslo, Norway. The competition was inaugurated in 1966 and is regarded as Norway's biggest trotting event. It is raced over 2,100 meters and is part of the European Grand Circuit. The overall purse for the 2009 event was 2.87 million Norwegian kroner (NOK), equalling approximately US$427,000 or €308,000. The fastest winning time in the history of the race is 1:11.5, run by L'Amiral Mauzun in 2008.

== Racing conditions ==
Oslo Grand Prix is since 1981 been decided through a race over 2,100 meter. Before that, the event had different looks. In the debut year, 1966, the event consisted of two heats over different distances (1,600 and 2,100 meters). The same eight horses competed in both heats and the winner was the horse with the best total ranking. These conditions were altered the second year, 1967. Two heats were still used, but this year they were over 1,700 and 2,100 meters, with richer horses starting 20 meters behind. 1973 the event went back to being decided over one 1,600 and one 2,100 heat. Between 1976 and 1980, 16 horses competed, divided into two elimination heats, from which a number of horses progressed to the final the same day. In 1976, both the eliminations and the final were over 1,700 meters. In 1978 autostart (a motorized gate) was introduced, and the Oslo Grand Prixs of 1978-1980 consisted of eliminations heat over 1,600 meters followed by finals over 2,100 meters. From 1981, the present conditions have been ruling. One single race over 2,100 meters, started by a motorized gate.

== The 2012 Oslo Grand Prix ==
May 13 2012

1. (France) Roxane Grif - Eric Raffin
2. (Sweden) Yarrah Boko - Kai Johansen
3. (France) Quarcio du Chene - Björn Goop
4. (France) Timoko - Richard Westerink
5. (United States) Arch Madness - Trond Smedshammer
6. (Sweden) Commander Crowe - Christophe Martens
7. (Norway) Viking Frecel - Vidar Hop
8. (Canada) Windsong Geant - Rick Zeron
9. (Sweden) Beanie M.M. - Johnny Takter
10. (Sweden) Joke Face - Lutfi Kolgjini

== Past winners ==
=== Horses with most wins ===
- 2 - Copiad (1994, 1995)
- 2 - Gidde Palema (2003, 2004)
- 2 - Grande Frances (1976, 1978)
- 2 - Rex Rodney (1986, 1987)

=== Drivers with most wins ===
- 3 - Åke Svanstedt (1997, 2003, 2004)
- 2 - Erik Berglöf (1994, 1995)
- 2 - Kjell Håkonsen (1985, 1986)
- 2 - Stig H. Johansson (1991, 2000)
- 2 - Gösta Nordin (1967, 1969)
- 2 - Sören Nordin (1972, 1973)
- 2 - Ulf Thoresen (1976, 1978)
- 2 - Joseph Verbeeck (1992, 1998)

=== Sires with most winning offsprings ===
- 2 - Nevele Pride (Hickory Almahurst, Meadow Roland)
- 2 - Noble Victory (E.O. Brunn, Noble Action)
- 2 - Texas (Nordin Hanover, Copiad)

=== Countries, number of wins ===
Based on the nationalities of the winning horses' owners:

- 24 - Sweden
- 6 - France
- 4 - Norway
- 3 - United States
- 2 - Denmark
- 1 - Germany
- 1 - Italy
- 1 - Netherlands
- 1 - Switzerland

=== Fastest winner ===
==== Auto start (1978-) ====
===== Short distance (1,600 m) =====
- 1:15,8 (km rate) - Madison Avenue (1978) and Gadames (1980)

===== Middle distance (2,100 m) =====
- 1:11.5 (km rate) - L'Amiral Mauzun (2008)

==== Volt start (1966-1976) ====
===== Short distance (1,600 - 1,700 m) =====
- 1:18.1 (km rate) - Noble Action (1972)

===== Middle distance (≈2,100 m) =====
- 1:20,6 (km rate) - Molnets Broder (1975) (won the longer of that year's two races and finished second overall)

=== All winners of Oslo Grand Prix ===
Year	Winner	Driver	Trainer	Owner	Km. Time
1966	Scott Protector	Karsten Buer	Karsten Buer	Asbjørn Jensen (Norway)	1:23.0
1967	Xanthe	Gösta Nordin	Robert Westergren	Robert Westergren (Sweden)	1:23.6
1968	Race cancelled
1969	Baron Gruff	Gösta Nordin	Gösta Nordin	Stall Gruff (Sweden)	1:23.5
1970	Race cancelled
1971	Unor	Lars Axelsson	Lars Axelsson	Stall Montigny (Sweden)	1:19.5
1972	Noble Action	Sören Nordin	Sören Nordin	Stall Hak / Stall Idre (Sweden)	1:18.1
1973	Gaby Bulwark	Sören Nordin	Sören Nordin	Stall Rol Christ / Fello / Opal (Sweden)	1:18.6
1974	Boett	Sören Norberg	Sören Norberg	Karl Adolfsson (Sweden)	1:21.0
1975	Hassan Star	Kjell P. Dahlström	Kjell P. Dahlström	Ulla Dahlström (Sweden)	1:19.1
1976	Grande Frances	Ulf Thoresen	Bengt Arvidsson	Stall Oskar (Sweden)	1:19.7
1977	Race cancelled
1978	Grande Frances	Ulf Thoresen	Bengt Arvidsson	Stall Oskar (Sweden)	1:17.0
1979	Hillion Brillouard	Philippe Allaire	Christian Riviere	Ch. Riviere (France)	1:19.9
1980	Express Gaxe	Gunnar Axelryd	Gunnar Axelryd	Stall Bafata (Sweden)	1:17.1
1981	Pamir Brodde	Karl Erik Nilsson	Karl Erik Nilsson	Stall Point (Sweden)	1:16.3
1982	Zorrino	Tommy Hanné	Tommy Hanné	Ingvar Andersson (Sweden)	1:18.9
1983	E.O. Brunn	Bo William Takter	Bo William Takter	Stall Tranen (Sweden)	1:15.6
1984	Hickory Almahurst	Ulf Nordin	Ulf Nordin	M. C. Andersen (Denmark)	1:16.3
1985	Ogorek	Michel Roussel	Michel Roussel	Jean Pachoud (Switzerland)	1:16.0
1986	Rex Rodney	Kjell Håkonsen	Kjell Håkonsen	Torleif Thu (Norway)	1:14.7
1987	Rex Rodney	Kjell Håkonsen	Kjell Håkonsen	Torleif Thu (Norway)	1:13.7
1988	Sugarcane Hanover	Gunnar Eggen	Gunnar Eggen	Stall Cheval (United States)	1:12.5
1989	Ourasi	Michel Marcel Gougeon	Jean Rene Gougeon	R. Ostheimer (France)	1:13.5
1990	Meadow Roland	Preben Kjærsgaard	Preben Kjærsgaard	M. Duckert / Stald E.H. / Stut. Focus (Denmark)	1:13.8
1991	Peace Corps	Stig H. Johansson	Stig H. Johansson	AB Gnägget (Sweden)	1:14.1
1992	Sea Cove	Joseph Verbeeck	Harald Grendel	Gestut Cicero (Germany)	1:14.6
1993	Nordin Hanover	Olle Goop	Olle Goop	Håkan Andersson (Sweden)	1:14.3
1994	Copiad	Erik Berglöf	Erik Berglöf	Stall Succé (Sweden)	1:12.7
1995	Copiad	Erik Berglöf	Erik Berglöf	Stall Succé (Sweden)	1:12.7
1996	Ina Scot	Helen A. Johansson	Kjell P. Dahlström	Ina Q AB / Kjell Dahlström AB (Sweden)	1:12.9
1997	Zoogin	Åke Svanstedt	Åke Svanstedt	Håkan Anderssons Åkeri (Sweden)	1:14.6
1998	Huxtable Hornline	Joseph Verbeeck	Anders Lindqvist	Leverre International S.A. (Luxembourg)	1:13.2
1999	Ganymede	Jean Pierre Dubois	Jean Pierre Dubois	Daniel Wildenstein (France)	1:12.6
2000	Victory Tilly	Stig H. Johansson	Stig H. Johansson	Stall Kalas (Sweden)	1:12.0
2001	Giant Cat	Nicolas Roussel	Nicolas Roussel	Mme. Bernard Bessiere (France)	1:12.1
2002	Brads Photo	Wilhelm Pal	Holger Ehlert	Scuderia Vilenzo (Italy)	1:13.9
2003	Gidde Palema	Åke Svanstedt	Åke Svanstedt	Stall Palema (Sweden)	1:12.2
2004	Gidde Palema	Åke Svanstedt	Åke Svanstedt	Stall Palema (Sweden)	1:11.7
2005	Steinlager	Per Oleg Midtfjeld	Per Oleg Midtfjeld	Knut Olausson (Norway)	1:12.5
2006	Mara Bourbon	Erik Adielsson	Jean Pierre Dubois	Jean Pierre Dubois (France)	1:13.2
2007	Super Light	Jörgen Westerholm	Jörgen Westerholm	Stall Velvet Trav AB (Sweden)	1:12.2
2008	L’Amiral Mauzun	Tony Le Beller	Jean-Philippe Ducher	Comte Paul de Senneville (France)	1:11.5
2009	Russel November	Hugo Langeweg, Jr	Hugo Langeweg, Jr	Stal Amsterdam (Netherlands)	1:14.3
2010	Lisa America	Jorma Kontio	Jerry Riordan	Guida Italia Sc (Italy)	1:11.7
2011	Arch Madness	Björn Goop	Trond Smedshammer	Marc D. Goldberg / Willow Pond LLC (United States)	1:11.5
2012	Commander Crowe	Christophe Martens	Fabrice Souloy	Snogarps Gård AB (Sweden)	1:11.5
2013	Sebastian K.	Åke Svanstedt	Åke Svanstedt	Knutsson Trotting AB (Sweden)	1:12.8
2014	Univers de Pan	Philippe Daugeard	Philippe Daugeard	M. Olivier Horvath (France)	1:11.9
2015	B.B.S. Sugarlight	Peter Untersteiner	Fredrik Solberg	Stall Sugarlight & Gunnar Karlsen (Norway)	1:11.3
2016	Your Highness	Bjørn Goop	Fabrice Souloy	P.V.Racing Stable HB & Ullo AB (Sweden)	1:10.5
2017	Twister Bi	Christoffer Eriksson	Jerry Riordan	Pasquale Ciccarelli (Italy)	1:12.6
2018	Evil Enok M.E.	Noralf Brækken	Noralf Brækken	Stall Forza Fugla (Norway)	1:11.1
2019	Vitruvio	Jorma Kontio	Alessandro Gocciadoro	Scuderia Pink & Black S.R (Italy)	1:11.6
2020	Blé du Gers	Per Oleg Midtfjeld	Frode Hamre	Ecurie J.M. Rancoule (France)	1:10.0
2021	Blé du Gers	Åsbjörn Tengsareid	Frode Hamre	Ecurie J.M. Rancoule (France)	1:12.5
2022	Stoletheshow	Frode Hamre	Frode Hamre	Global Glide AB (Norway)	1:10.5

== See also ==
- List of Scandinavian harness horse races
