= Jag de Bellouet =

French racehorse (1997–2025)

- Breed: Trotteur français
- Sire: Viking's Way
- Grandsire: Mickey Viking
- Dam: Vaunoise
- Maternal grandsire: Nicos du Vivier
- Sex: Stallion
- Foaled: 17 May 1997; Argentan, France
- Died: 3 February 2025 (aged 27)
- Country: France
- Colour: Brown
- Breeder: S.C.E.A. Ecuire Monthean JC
- Owner: Michel Gallier
- Trainer: Christophe Gallier

Record
- 115: 36-11-6

Earnings
- US$ 5,457,779

Major wins
- Prix de Cornulier (2004, 2005, 2006); Prix de Paris (2004); Prix de l'Atlantique (2004, 2005, 2006); Prix René Ballière (2004, 2005); Prix d'Amérique (2005); Prix de France (2006); Kymi Grand Prix (Finland) (2006)
- Last updated on: 2009-01-28.

Jag de Bellouet (17 May 1997 – 3 February 2025) was a French racing trotter by Viking's Way out of Vaunoise by Nicos du Vivier.

Jag de Bellouet was foaled in Argentan, France on 17 May 1997. His most prestigious victories include the Prix d'Amérique, Prix de Cornulier, Prix de France and Prix de Paris. At the end of his career, the stallion had earned US$5,457,779 (€4,223,699). Jag de Bellouet died on 3 February 2025, at the age of 27.

== Pedigree ==
Pedigree of Jag de Bellouet (France)
Sire Viking's Way (France)	Mickey Viking (United States)	Bonefish (United States)	Nevele Pride (United States)
Sire Viking's Way (France)	Mickey Viking (United States)	Bonefish (United States)	Exciting Speed (United States)
Sire Viking's Way (France)	Mickey Viking (United States)	Misty Sister (United States)	Songcan (United States)
Sire Viking's Way (France)	Mickey Viking (United States)	Misty Sister (United States)	Agaunar (Italy)
Sire Viking's Way (France)	Josubie (France)	Quito (France)	Carioca II (France)
Sire Viking's Way (France)	Josubie (France)	Quito (France)	Arlette III (France)
Sire Viking's Way (France)	Josubie (France)	Vesubie III (France)	Hermes D (France)
Sire Viking's Way (France)	Josubie (France)	Vesubie III (France)	Jacinthe IV (France)
Dam Vaunoise (France)	Nicos du Vivier (France)	Sabi Pas (France)	Carioca II (France)
Dam Vaunoise (France)	Nicos du Vivier (France)	Sabi Pas (France)	Infante II (France)
Dam Vaunoise (France)	Nicos du Vivier (France)	Eva du Vivier (France)	Prince des Veys (France)
Dam Vaunoise (France)	Nicos du Vivier (France)	Eva du Vivier (France)	Ua Uka (France)
Dam Vaunoise (France)	Quenavora (France)	Paleo (France)	Fandango (France)
Dam Vaunoise (France)	Quenavora (France)	Paleo (France)	Rosina (France)
Dam Vaunoise (France)	Quenavora (France)	Celse Glatigny (France)	Quodshou M F (France)
Dam Vaunoise (France)	Quenavora (France)	Celse Glatigny (France)	Pasadena (France)
