= Jägersro =

- Neighbourhood
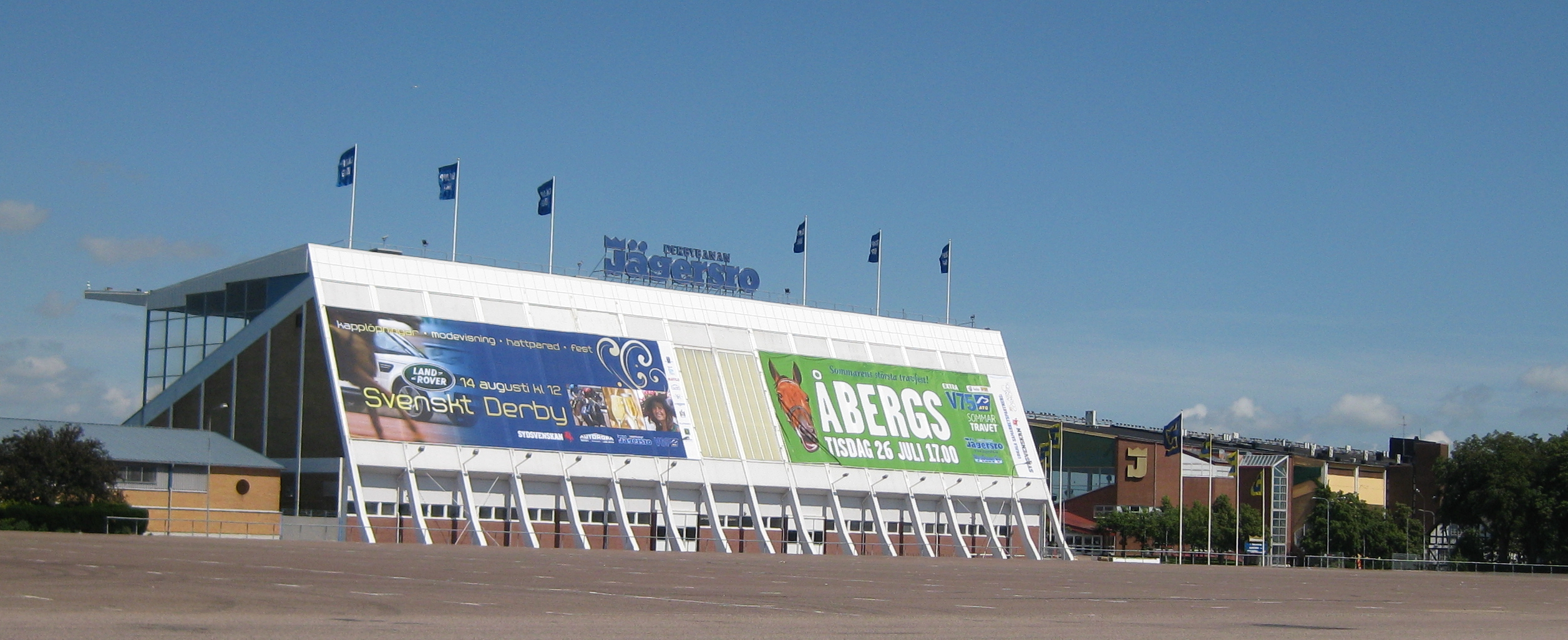
- Interactive map of Jägersro
- Coordinates: 55°34′24″N 13°03′51″E
- Country: Sweden
- Province: Skåne
- County: Skåne County
- Municipality: Malmö Municipality
- Borough of Malmö: Husie

Population (1 January 2011)
  - Total: 16
- Time zone: UTC+1 (CET)
  - Summer (DST): UTC+2 (CEST)

Jägersro is a neighbourhood of Malmö, situated in the Borough of Husie, Malmö Municipality, Skåne County, Sweden.

Jägersro trav & galopp is a horse racing facility located in the neighbourhood. It was opened in 1907 and is the oldest one of its kind in the country. It is also southern Sweden's biggest facility for harness racing and thoroughbred horse racing. Hugo Åbergs Memorial and Swedish Trotting Derby is held there annually.
