= Solvalla =

Horse racing track in Stockholm, Sweden

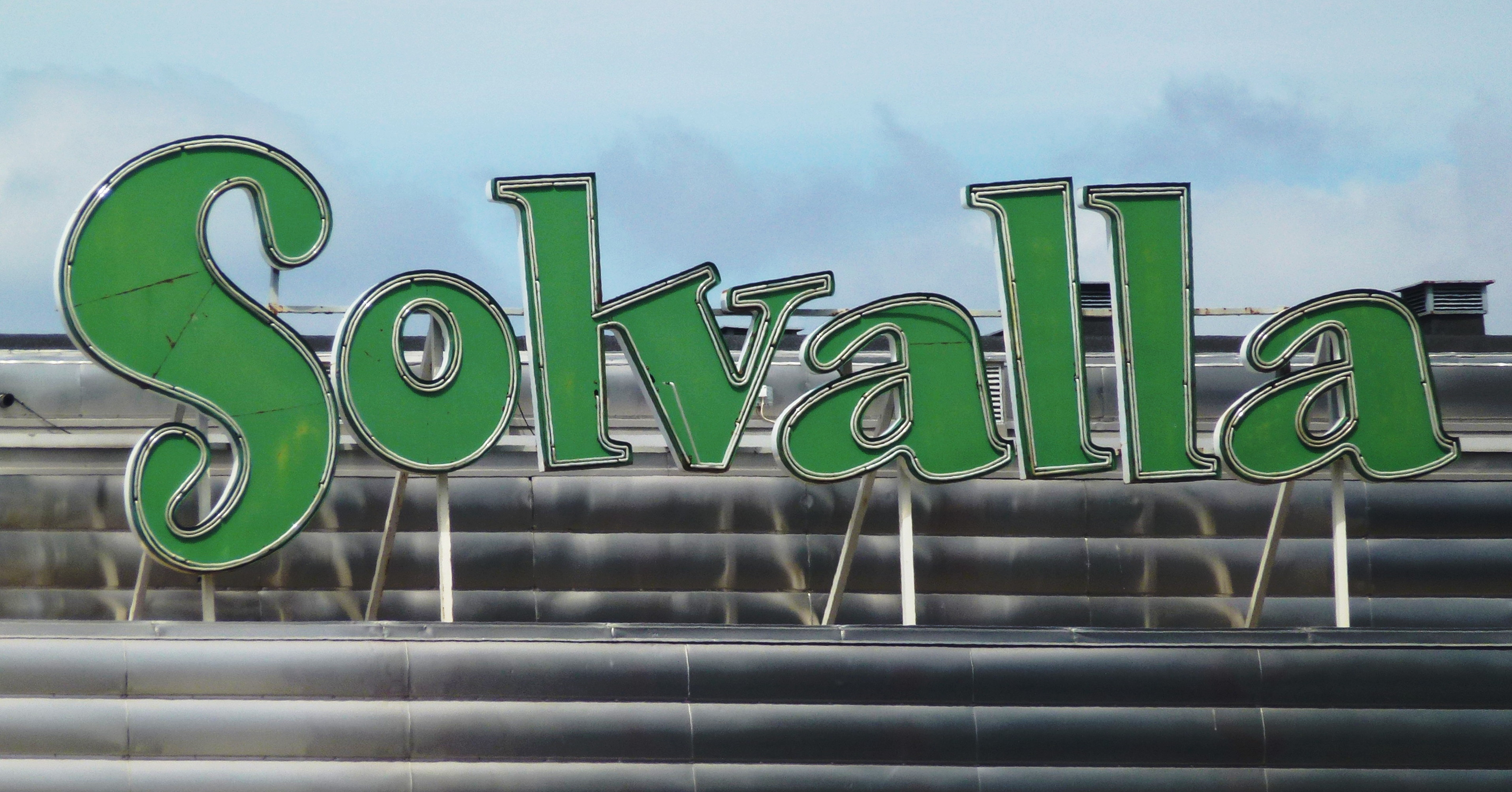
- Location: Bromma, Stockholm, Sweden
- Coordinates: 59°22′03″N 17°56′23″E
- Date opened: 1927
- Race type: Harness
- Notable races: Elitloppet, Swedish Trotting Criterium, Swedish Trotting Oaks, Jubileumspokalen

Solvalla is a horse racing track located in Bromma, Stockholm, Sweden. It opened in 1927 and is the largest harness racing venue in the Nordic countries. The racecourse has a capacity of 35,000 spectators. The last Sunday in May, Solvalla annually hosts Elitloppet, one of the most prestigious international trotting events in the world.

== Major events ==
=== Elitloppet ===
- International Group I race.
- Setup: Sixteen invited horses are divided into two elimination heats. Four horses from each heat progress to the final, raced later the same day. All races are of 1,609 meters, i.e. one mile.
- Date: Is always raced on the last Sunday of May.
- Purse (2009, the final and the elimination heats included): ≈US$803,000 (SEK 6,100,000).

Elitloppet is always in the last Sunday in may. During the same weekend there are also the Group II races Sweden Cup and the stayer race Harper Hanovers Race, as well as Elitkampen for coldblood trotters.

=== Swedish Trotting Criterium ===
- National Group I stakes race for Swedish three-year-olds.
- Setup (2008): Six elimination races from which the first two horses progressed to the final eleven days later. All races 2,640 meters long.
- Date (2008, the final): 5 October.
- Purse (2008, the final only): ≈US$458,000 (SEK 3,200,000).

=== Swedish Trotting Oaks ===
- National Group I stakes race for Swedish three-year-old fillies.
- Setup (2008): Six elimination races from which the first two horses progressed to the final eleven days later. All races 2,140 meters long.
- Date (2008, the final): 5 October.
- Purse (2008, the final only): ≈US$286,000 (SEK 2,000,000).

=== Jubileumspokalen ===
- International Group I race.
- Setup (2008): 2,140 meters. Ten horses competed in the event. Some were invited, some qualified through qualification races.
- Date (2008): 9 August.
- Purse (2008): ≈US$281,000 (SEK 1,750,000).

=== Scandinavian Touring Cars ===
Since 2012 the venue has been used as a motor racing venue and hosts a round of the Scandinavian Touring Car Championship.

== Driver champions ==
Since the track's opening in 1927, there have been only 14 different driver champions at Solvalla. From 1934 until 1976, one of the three Nordin brothers won every year, with the exception of 1949 and 1975. Oldest brother Gösta won ten times, as did middle brother Gunnar. Youngest brother Sören Nordin was track champion 21 times. Their father Ernst J. Nordin was champion 1928 and 1929. After the dominance of the Nordins, Stig H. Johansson took over and claimed the champion title no less than 29 times between 1975 and 2005, his last year as a driver. 27 these titles were consecutive, from 1979 to 2005. Jorma Kontio is the reigning driver champion.

=== Driver champions ranked by number of titles ===
Rank	Driver	Number of titles	Years
1	Stig H. Johansson	29	1975, 1977, 1979–2005
2	Sören Nordin	21	1942, 1944–1946, 1948, 1954, 1956–1959, 1961, 1963–1964, 1966, 1969–1974, 1976
3	Gunnar Nordin	10	1947, 1950–1951, 1953, 1955, 1960, 1962, 1965, 1967–1968
	Gösta Nordin	10	1934–1941, 1943, 1952
5	Sixten Lundgren	3	1931–1933
	Björn Goop	3	2007–2009
7	Ernst J. Nordin	2	1928–1929
	Erik Adielsson	2	2006, 2011
	Jorma Kontio	2	2012, 2013
10	Alfred Johansson	1	1927
	Carl A. Schoug	1	1930
	Erik Larsson	1	1949
	Berndt Lindstedt	1	1978
	Örjan Kihlström	1	2010

=== Most wins in one year ===
- Stig H. Johansson - 194 (in 1992)
