= Konung Gustaf V:s Pokal =

- Class: Group One International
- Location: Åby Racetrack, Mölndal, Sweden
- Inaugurated: 1941 (1949)
- Race type: Harness race for standardbred trotters

Race information
- Distance: 2,140 meters (1.33 miles)
- Track: Left-handed 1,000 meter track (0.62 mile)
- Qualification: Qualifying races. 4-year-old stallions and geldings
- Purse: ≈US$273,000

Konung Gustaf V:s Pokal (literally: King Gustaf V's Trophy) or, in shorter form, Kungapokalen (literally: The King's Trophy), is an annual international Group One harness event for trotters. It is held at Åby Racetrack in Mölndal, 10 km south of Gothenburg, Sweden. It is a stakes race for 4-year-old stallions and geldings. The purse in the 2009 final was ≈US$273,000 (€200,000), of which the winner Knockout Rose won half.

== Origin ==
In 1941, Åby inaugurated Jubileumslöpningen to celebrate that the track had been open for 5 years. Jubileumslöpningen was raced until 1948. Then, Swedish king Gustaf V donated a trophy to Åby, a trophy that had been produced according to the king's own wishes. The event changed name and since 1949, The King's Trophy has been an annually recurring event at Åby Racetrack.

== Racing conditions ==
From the start until 1976, the distance of Kungapokalen was 2,200-2,300 meters (1.37-1.43 miles). Between 1977 and 1982, the distance was either 2,140 or 2,160 meters (1.33-1.34 miles). Since 1983, a year of several changes, the distance has been exclusively 2,140 meters. The same year, the starting method was changed from volt start to auto start.

1983 was Kungapokalen for the first time a stakes race solely for Swedish-bred, four-year-old trotters. The same year, Drottning Silvias Pokal, a big event open only for Swedish four-year-old mares, was inaugurated at Åby as well. In 2002, the conditions were changed and Kungapokalen was opened for foreign four-year-olds as well.

The final of the event is preceded by a number of elimination races, taking place approximately ten days before the final. Since 2000, the number of elimination heats has been either three or four per year.

== The 2009 Konung Gustaf V:s Pokal ==
The three elimination heats of the 2009 event took place on April 30, 14 days before the final. The winners of these heats, Yewish Boko, Lavec Kronos and Reven d'Amour, together with Marshland, were to be considered favourites in the final on April 14, especially since star trotter Maharajah was withdrawn due to illness.

=== The starting list ===
1. Lavec Kronos - Johnny Takter (Lutfi Kolgjini)
2. Reven d'Amour - Fredrik B. Larsson (Henrik Larsson)
3. Yewish Boko - Åke Svanstedt (Timo Nurmos)
4. Marshland - Örjan Kilhström (Stefan Hultman)
5. Knockout Rose - Erik Adielsson (Stig H. Johansson)
6. ~~Maharajah~~ - Did not start
7. Lou Kronos - Lutfi Kolgjini
8. Insect Face - Robert Bergh (Marcus Lindgren)
9. Rakas - Per Lennartsson
10. Wiranas Dream - Thomas Uhrberg (Anna Forssell)
11. Revenue J:r - Jörgen Sjunnesson (Lutfi Kolgini)
12. Noras Bean - Stefan Söderkvist (Ulf Stenströmer)

(Trainer, if other than driver, in parentheses)

=== The race ===
Lavec Kronos took the lead. Lennartsson placed Rakas behind the leader, while Knockout Rose ran as third on the rail. Outside, Lavec Kronos got favourite Reven d'Amour, while second and third favourites, Marshland and Yewish Boko, spent their time further down the field. Yewish Boko made an attempt to attack the two up front (Lavec Kronos and Reven d'Amour) but ended up breaking stride before the final stretch. Knockout Rose was released by Adielsson down the stretch and won by a length before outsider Noras Bean. Rakas came third.

The Stig H. Johansson-trained stallion Knockout Rose, sired by Express Ride, won in 1:57.3f (mile rate)/1:13.1 (km rate).

== Past winners ==
=== Drivers with most wins ===
- 6 - Sören Nordin
- 5 - Stig H. Johansson
- 4 - Gösta Nordin
- 3 - Tommy Hanné
- 3 - Lars Lindberg
- 3 - Berndt Lindstedt
- 3 - Gunnar Nordin
- 2 - Olle Goop
- 2 - Olof Persson
- 2 - Ragnar Thorngren

=== Trainers with most wins ===
- 7 - Sören Nordin
- 6 - Stig H. Johansson
- 4 - Gösta Nordin
- 3 - Tommy Hanné
- 3 - Gunnar Nordin
- 3 - Håkan Wallner
- 2 - Lars Lindberg
- 2 - Stefan Melander
- 2 - Olof Persson
- 2 - Ragnar Thorngren

=== Sires with at least two winning offsprings ===
- 4 - Bulwark (Hetty, Justus, Bulwarkson, Delta)
- 4 - Sir Walter Scott (Holly Scott, Fänrik Scott, Magnifik, Roland)
- 3 - Dartmouth (Dartster F., Rex Håleryd, Dior Broline)
- 3 - Tibur (Mustard, Rebur, Ata Star L.)
- 2 - Clean Sweep (Junker, Moneymaker)
- 2 - Earl's Mr Will (Indian Will, Duke Abbey)
- 2 - Fibber (Clementz, Julius Fibber)
- 2 - Lindy's Crown (Atlantic F.C., St Göran)
- 2 - Super Arnie (Gigant Neo, Dust All Over)

=== Mares with at least two winning offsprings ===
- 2 - Grand Duchess (Justus, Delta)
- 2 - Gullan Fafner (Magnifik, Roland)

=== Winning stallions that have also sired winners ===
- Adept (1957), sire of Najo (1971)
- Baron Karsk (1993), sire of Equalizer (2001)
- Big Noon (1941), sire of Casanova (1954)
- Justus (1946), sire of Jussi (1960)

=== Winner with lowest odds ===
- Winning odds: 1.28 - Quiggin (1984)

=== Winner with highest odds ===
- Winning odds: 98.62 - Najo (1971)

=== Fastest winners ===
==== Auto start ====
- 1:12.7 (km rate) - Gigant Neo (2002)

==== Volt start ====
- 1:17.0 (km rate) - Dartster F. (1980)

=== All winners of Konung Gustaf V:s Pokal ===
Year	Horse	Driver	Trainer	Odds of winner	Winning time (km rate)
2026	Pure Count	Carl Johan Jepson	Fredrik Wallin	7.06	1:10.7
2025	Free Time Jepson	Alessandro Gocciadoro	Alessandro Gocciadoro	1.47	1:11.2
2024	Baron Tilly	Carl Johan Jepson	David Persson	5.55	1:11.9
2023	Dancer Brodde	Johan Untersteiner	Johan Untersteiner	2.99	1:11.7
2022	Francesco Zet	Örjan Kihlström	Daniel Redén	1.36	1:11.9
2021	Önas Prince	Per Nordström	Per Nordström	1.66	1:13.0
2020	Aetos Kronos	Johan Untersteiner	Jerry Riordan	5.51	1:11.5
2019	Campo Bahia	Conrad Lugauer	Conrad Lugauer	2.28	1:10.6
2018	Perfect Spirit	Örjan Kihlström	Daniel Redén	2.19	1:11.1
2017	Diamanten	Christoffer Eriksson	Robert Bergh	7.84	1:12.5
2016	Poet Broline	Peter Untersteiner	Peter Untersteiner	6.88	1:12.7
2015	Volstead	Örjan Kihlström	Stefan Melander	4.11	1:12.7
2014	Poochai	Erik Adielsson	Svante Båth	6.60	1:11.9
2013	El Mago Pellini	Lutfi Kolgjini	Lutfi Kolgjini	4.20	1:12.1
2012	Fawkes	Åke Svanstedt	Åke Svanstedt	10.72	1:13.0
2011	Wishing Stone	Jean-Michel Bazire	Fabrice Souloy	3.26	1:12.7
2010	Sebastian K.	Erik Adielsson	Lutfi Kolgjini	19.14	1:12.8
2009	Knockout Rose	Erik Adielsson	Stig H. Johansson	8.09	1:13.1
2008	Dust All Over	Örjan Kihlström	Roger Walmann	10.04	1:13.4
2007	Russell November	Hugo Langeweg	Hugo Langeweg	1.98	1:13.8
2006	Right On Track	Jörgen Westholm	Jörgen Westholm	11.18	1:14.3
2005	Conny Nobell	Björn Goop	Björn Goop	1.29	1:14.1
2004	Luxury Ås	Lars Lindberg	Svante Båth	3.44	1:13.7
2003	Rotation	Gunnar Eggen	Harald Lunde	2.05	1:12.8
2002	Gigant Neo	Jorma Kontio	Stefan Melander	6.72	1:12.7
2001	Equalizer	Staffan Nilsson	Staffan Nilsson	2.19	1:14.9
2000	St Göran	Stig H. Johansson	Stig H. Johansson	3.01	1:13.8
1999	Lucky Po	Stefan Melander	Stefan Melander	8.73	1:14.5
1998	Kanaloa Sea	Patrik Södervall	Patrik Södervall	4.70	1:15.0
1997	Remington Crown	Robert Bergh	Robert Bergh	2.81	1:15.0
1996	Drewgi	Åke Svanstedt	Tommy K. Jansson	5.51	1:15.8
1995	Atlantic F.C.	Christer Nylander	Christer Nylander	15.84	1:16.2
1994	Clipper Mack	Stig H. Johansson	Stig H. Johansson	2.87	1:14.8
1993	Baron Karsk	Stig H. Johansson	Stig H. Johansson	1.92	1:14.7
1992	Guy Scoop	Olle Goop	Erik Berglöf	2.51	1:15.9
1991	Extrem	Roger L. Johansson	Tommy Jansson	4.20	1:16.2
1990	Bowspirit	Lars Lindberg	Lars Lindberg	6.28	1:16.4
1989	On Guard	Olle Goop	Olle Goop	3.28	1:16.2
1988	Gaston Pride	Per-Olof Pettersson	Per-Olof Pettersson	4.63	1:16.8
1987	Ata Star L.	Tommy Hanné	Tommy Hanné	2.44	1:15.2
1986	Net Hammering	Lars Lindberg	Lars Lindberg	3.40	1:16.8
1985	Rebur	Roland Korsar	Roland Korsar	4.91	1:16.2
1984	Quiggin	Stig H. Johansson	Stig H. Johansson	1.28	1:15.6
1983	Solo Hagen	Ulf Nordin	Ulf Nordin	1.94	1:14.8
1982	Dior Broline	Holger Bengtsson	Holger Bengtsson	3.86	1:17.7
1981	Rex Håleryd	Stig H. Johansson	Stig H. Johansson	3.71	1:18.2
1980	Dartster F.	Olle Hedin	Olle Hedin	2.39	1:17.0
1979	Mustard	Sören Nordin	Sören Nordin	2.72	1:20.1
1978	Vilden	Torbjörn Jansson	Torbjörn Jansson	5.60	1:21.2
1977	Express Gaxe	Gunnar Axelryd	Gunnar Axelryd	3.04	1:20.6
1976	Windster	Thomas Nilsson	Thomas Nilsson	8.96	1:21.4
1975	Regina Roy	Sören Nordin	Sören Nordin	2.85	1:19.5
1974	Thomas R.N.	Jan Ödquist	Jan Ödquist	2.78	1:20.5
1973	Progressiv	Tommy Hanné	Tommy Hanné	19.39	1:21.0
1972	Sabina Scotch	Tommy Hanné	Tommy Hanné	29.98	1:21.0
1971	Najo	Rune Johansson	Rune Johansson	98.62	1:19.1
1970	Zadar Deaner	Berndt Lindstedt	Håkan Wallner	16.72	1:20.5
1969	Julius Fibber	Håkan Wallner	Håkan Wallner	14.11	1:22.6
1968	Ever Star	Gunnar Nordin	Gunnar Nordin	3.06	1:22.1
1967	Guy W.	Berndt Lindstedt	Håkan Wallner	6.63	1:20.3
1966	Allé	Sören Nordin	Sören Nordin	1.62	1:21.2
1965	Moneymaker	Berndt Lindstedt	Berndt Lindstedt	4.86	1:21.8
1964	Carr	Gösta Nordin	Gösta Nordin	1.34	1:21.9
1963	Sailor	Gunnar Nordin	Gunnar Nordin	4.33	1:23.2
1962	Duke Abbey	Olof Persson	Olof Persson	18.28	1:21.3
1961	Junker	Olof Persson	Olof Persson	10.07	1:22.5
1960	Jussi	Sven Berggren	Uno Swed	4.52	1:23.7
1959	Clementz	Sören Nordin	Sören Nordin	5.08	1:22.2
1958	Golden Song	Sören Nordin	Sören Nordin	2.39	1:20.8
1957	Adept	Kurt Mattson	Kurt Mattson	1.75	1:23.3
1956	Vola Scotch	Sten Wilén	Gösta Nordin	15.64	1:24.0
1955	Indian Will	Ragnar Thorngren	Ragnar Thorngren	29.12	1:23.6
1954	Casanova	Svante Andersson	Svante Andersson	21.81	1:23.3
1953	Bellomite	Erik Larsson	Erik Larsson	11.58	1:25.0
1952	Delta	Stig Johnsson	Stig Johnsson	10.54	1:24.5
1951	Carlatera	Gunnar Nordin	Gunnar Nordin	10.94	1:23.1
1950	Landerne	Hans Ringström	Hans Ringström	18.50	1:24.4
1949	Roland	Hugo Nordqvist	Hugo Nordqvist	2.93	1:25.3
1948	Magnifik	Tage Stridsberg	Tage Stridsberg	6.00	1:25.1
1947	Bulwarkson	Gösta Nordin	Sören Nordin	9.39	1:24.3
1946	Justus	Sören Nordin	Sören Nordin	2.48	1:21.5
1945	Hetty	Gösta Nordin	Gösta Nordin	1.95	1:23.8
1944	Fänrik Scott	Carl A. Schoug	Carl A. Schoug	2.58	1:24.9
1943	Holly Scott	Gustaf Schein	Gustaf Schein	10.41	1:24.7
1942	Trumps	Ragnar Thorngren	Ragnar Thorngren	1.76	1:23.9
1941	Big Noon	Gösta Nordin	Gösta Nordin	3.35	1:22.8

== See also ==
- List of Scandinavian harness horse races
