= Åby Stora Pris =

- Class: Group One International
- Location: Åby Racetrack, Mölndal, Sweden
- Inaugurated: 1936
- Race type: Harness race for standardbred trotters
- Website: Åby Stora Pris (Swedish)

Race information
- Distance: 1,640 meters (1.02 miles)
- Track: Left-handed 1,000 meter track (0.62 mile)
- Qualification: Invitational, 4 years or older
- Purse: ≈US$359,000

Åby Stora Pris (literally "Åby Grand Prize") is an annual Group One harness event for trotters that is held at Åby Racetrack in Mölndal, 10 km south of Gothenburg, Sweden. Åby Stora Pris has taken place since 1936, the same year Åby Racetrack was opened. In 2008, the purse of the event was approximately US$359,000 (SEK2,400,000). Åby Stora Pris is part of the European Grand Circuit.

== Racing conditions ==
Through the years, the conditions of the event have varied. Before 2005, the winner was decided through a single race. This one race had since 1978 been of 2,140 meters. As from 2005, when the setup was changed, the same eight horses have been racing each other in two 1,640 meter-heats. These heats are followed by a race-off of 1,640 meters, if necessary, i.e. if the two heats are won by different horses.

With the exception of 1981, a motorized starting gate has been used to launch the race since 1979.

In 1978, when the distance was decreased to 2,140 meters, another shift was made as well. Date wise, the event had been held in May or June until then. After the change in 1978, it has been held in September, apart from the years 1990-92 when the race was in August.

The event is invitational, meaning only invited horses can participate. To come in contention for invitations, a horse must be of age four or above.

== Past winners ==
=== Horses with most wins ===
- 2 - Sebastian K. (2012, 2013)
- 2 - Gidde Palema (2003, 2005)
- 2 - Victory Tilly (2000, 2002)
- 2 - Zoogin (1995, 1996)
- 2 - Idéal du Gazeau (1981, 1982)
- 2 - Lyon (1970, 1972)
- 2 - Gelinotte (1956, 1957)
- 2 - Iran Scott (1951, 1952)

=== Sires with at least two winning offsprings ===
- 3 - Scotland (Scotch Thistle, Scotch Fez, Locomotive)
- 3 - Bulwark (Frances Bulwark, Optimist, Justus)
- 2 - Quick Pay (Victory Tilly, The Onion)
- 2 - Kairos (Gelinotte, Hairos II)
- 2 - Hermes D. (Pluvier III, Orlof)
- 2 - Hollyrood Harkaway (Trumps, Escape)

=== Mares with at least two winning offsprings ===
- 2 - My Sister Lou (Big Noon, Exklusiv)

=== Drivers with most wins ===
- 6 - Åke Svanstedt
- 5 - Stig H. Johansson
- 4 - Gösta Nordin
- 3 - Sören Nordin
- 3 - Ragnar Thorngren
- 3 - Jorma Kontio

=== Other note ===
Frances Bulwark is the only mare that have won the event herself (in 1950) in addition to having bred a winner, the stallion Frances Nibs, who won in 1964. Frances Nibs has also sired a winner, the champion of 1977, Micko Tilly. Thus this line represents winners in three generations.

=== All winners of Åby Stora Pris ===
Year	Horse	Driver	Country of owner	Odds of winner	Winning time	Distance in meters
2022	Moni Viking	Björn Goop	Norway	16,22	1:12.4	3,140
2021	Milligan's School	Ulf Eriksson	Sweden	8,27	1:11.8	3,140
2020	Moni Viking	Björn Goop	Norway	3,08	1:12.4	3,140
2019	Makethemark	Petri Salmela	Sweden	15,29	1:13.0	3,140
2018	Readly Express	Jorma Kontio	Sweden	2,07	1:13.2	3,140
2017	Midnight Hour	Iikka Nurmonen	Finland	23,83	1:16.9	1,640
2016	Un Mec d'Héripré	Björn Goop	France	1,93	1:11.0	1,640
2015	Västerbo Highflyer	Daniel Redén	Sweden	7,16	1:09.4	1,640
2014	Quid Pro Quo	Erik Adielsson	Sweden	22,09	1:10.3	1,640
2013	Sebastian K.	Jorma Kontio	Sweden	1,84	1:11.5	1,640
2012	Sebastian K.	Åke Svanstedt	Sweden	2,34	1:11.2	1,640
2011	Rapide Lebel	Eric Raffin	France	1,82	1:11.5	1,640
2010	Lisa America	Torbjörn Jansson	Italy		1:10.1	1,640
2009	Torvald Palema	Åke Svanstedt	Sweden		1:10.4	1,640
2008	Garland Kronos	Lutfi Kolgjini	Sweden	2.94	1:13.1	1,640
2007	Giant Superman	Fredrik B. Larsson	Sweden	2.14	1:13.5	1,640
2006	Red Chili Pirat	Örjan Kihlström	Sweden	7.01/5.82	1:11.3/1:11.6	1,640
2005	Gidde Palema	Åke Svanstedt	Sweden	1.41	1:13.3	2,140
2004	Steinlager	Per Oleg Midfjeld	Norway	7.14	1:13.5	2,140
2003	Gidde Palema	Åke Svanstedt	Sweden	2.20	1:12.1	2,140
2002	Victory Tilly	Stig H. Johansson	Sweden	1.28	1:13.5	2,140
2001	Etain Royal	Jorma Kontio	Finland	10.16	1:13.1	2,140
2000	Victory Tilly	Stig H. Johansson	Sweden	1.59	1:13.3	2,140
1999	Général du Pommeau	Jules Lepennetier	France	1.47	1:14.4	2,140
1998	Rite On Line	Atle Hamre	Norway	9.33	1:14.3	2,140
1997	Gentle Star	Gunleif Tollefsen	Norway	2.61	1:15.0	2,140
1996	Zoogin	Åke Svanstedt	Sweden	2.01	1:14.3	2,140
1995	Zoogin	Åke Svanstedt	Sweden	4.81	1:13.6	2,140
1994	Houston Laukko	Jorma Kontio	Finland	38.61	1:13.8	2,140
1993	Queen L.	Stig H. Johansson	Sweden	3.33	1:13.2	2,140
1992	Sea Cove	Joseph Verbeeck	Germany	15.32	1:14.5	2,140
1991	Prince Mystic	Atle Hamre	Norway	10.54	1:14.0	2,140
1990	Reve d'Udon	Yves Dreux	France	2.57	1:14.0	2,140
1989	Quellou	Pierre Levesque	France	8.43	1:14.9	2,140
1988	Ourasi	Jean-René Gougeon	France	1.73	1:14.5	2,140
1987	Jet Ribb	Hans G. Eriksson	Sweden	8.21	1:14.8	2,140
1986	Utah Bulwark	Stig H. Johansson	Sweden	1.37	1:14.3	2,140
1985	Minou du Donjon	Olle Goop	France	1.37	1:15.4	2,140
1984	The Onion	Stig H. Johansson	Sweden	3.80	1:14.8	2,140
1983	Legolas	Thomas Nilsson	Sweden	13.21	1:14.6	2,140
1982	Idéal du Gazeau	Eugène Lefèvre	France	2.20	1:15.6	2,140
1981	Idéal du Gazeau	Eugène Lefèvre	France	1.61	1:18.4	2,140
1980	Express Gaxe	Gunnar Axelryd	Sweden	2.96	1:15.0	2,140
1979	Hadol du Vivier	Jean-René Gougeon	France	2.22	1:15.5	2,140
1978	Charme Asserdal	Heikki Korpi	Finland	8.72	1:16.9	2,140
1977	Micko Tilly	Olle Lindqvist	Sweden	9.04	1:16.3	2,640
1976	Dines P.	Michel Feuillet	France	11.74	1:18.9	2,620
1975	Race cancelled					
1974	Knabe	Olle Goop	Sweden	5.92	1:18.6	2,600
1973	Bill D.	André L. Dreux	France	2.68	1:17.8	2,620
1972	Lyon	Olle Elfstrand	Sweden	1.86	1:21.3	2,600
1971	Harper Arrow	Lennart Stjernlöf	Sweden	2.86	1:21.0	2,600
1970	Lyon	Olle Elfstrand	Sweden	1.66	1.20,4	2,600
1969	Fairland	Uno Swed	Sweden	9.66	1:21.2	2,600
1968	Pulemjot	Stig H. Nilsson	Sweden	13.30	1:19.8	2,600
1967	Lill Mavil	Svenning Eriksson	Sweden	6.84	1:24.0	2,600
1966	Orlof	Algot Scott	Sweden	9.77	1:19.9	2,600
1965	Pluvier III	Gunnar Nordin	Sweden	3.48	1:19.8	2,620
1964	Frances Nibs	Olle Andersson	Sweden	7.36	1:21.3	2,620
1963	Oscar R.L.	Henri Levesque	France	2.07	1:20.4	2,620
1962	Aprilsnar	Kaj Hansen	Denmark	48.63	1:23.0	2,600
1961	Kracovie	Raoul Vercruysse	France	1.75	1:19.0	2,620
1960	Hairos II	Willem H. Geersen	Netherlands	1.90	1:18.6	2,640
1959	Icare IV	Walter Baroncini	France	3.33	1:19.3	2,640
1958	Io d'Amour	Eddie Freundt	West Germany	2.82	1:20.4	2,620
1957	Gelinotte	Charlie Mills	France	1.41	1:20.2	2,640
1956	Gelinotte	Charlie Mills	France	-	1:20.0	2,640
1955	Ejadon	Johannes Frömming	West Germany	7.00	1:18.9	2,640
1954	Mac Kinley	Willem H. Geersen	Netherlands	4.76	1:21.5	2,600
1953	Scotch Thistle	Vicenti Ossani	Italy	9.75	1:21.7	2,660
1952	Iran Scott	Carl A. Schoug	Sweden	5.91	1:22.8	2,640
1951	Iran Scott	Carl A. Schoug	Sweden	8.81	1:22.2	2,620
1950	Frances Bulwark	Sören Nordin	Sweden	4.99	1:22.3	2,600
1949	Scotch Fez	Sören Nordin	Sweden	2.29	1:22.4	2,620
1948	Locomotive	Gunnar Nordin	Sweden	4.04	1:21.8	2,420
1947	Optimist	Gösta Nordin	Sweden	2.96	1,23,7	2,380
1946	Justus	Sören Nordin	Sweden	1.63	1:23.4	2,180
1945	Dieter Asa	Stig Karlsson	Sweden	7.37	1:23.6	2,200
1944	Exklusiv	Gösta Nordin	Sweden	3.57	1:23.8	2,180
1943	Volburn	Gösta Nordin	Sweden	2.75	1:22.9	2,180
1942	Trumps	Ragnar Thorngren	Sweden	4.71	1:23.3	2,180
1941	Big Noon	Gösta Nordin	Sweden	1.75	1:21.9	2,180
1940	Craftsman	Oscar Persson	Sweden	2.56	1:22.0	2,220
1939	Harper Hanover	Oscar Persson	Sweden	1.79	1:21.0	2,240
1938	Escape	Ragnar Thorngren	Sweden	1.59	1:21.9	2,200
1937	True Hanover	Ragnar Thorngren	Sweden	2.81	1:25.1	2,200
1936	Guy Montgomery P.	Paul P. Nielsen	Sweden	2.32	1:28.6	2,200

== See also ==
- List of Scandinavian harness horse races
