= Johannes Frömming =

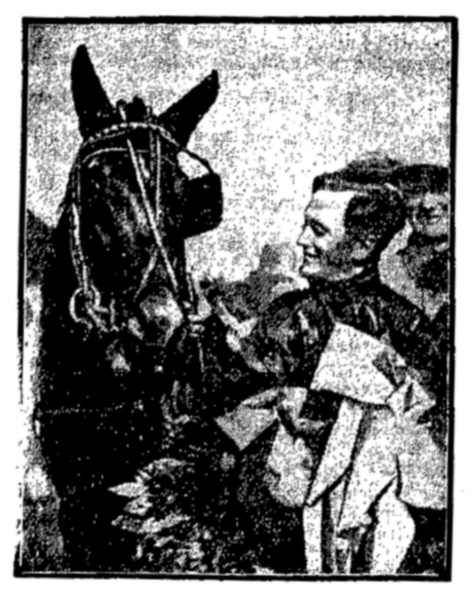
- Johannes Frömming and Xifra in 1933.
- Born: Johannes Wilhelm Arthur Frömming; 28 June 1910; Berlin, German Empire
- Died: 8 November 1996 (aged 86); Hamburg, Germany
- Known for: Harness racing driver and trainer

Johannes Wilhelm Arthur "Hänschen" Frömming (28 June 1910 – 8 November 1996) was a German harness racing driver and trainer. He is one of the most legendary horsemen in European harness racing.

Frömming started his career at the age of 16 in 1926 and drove his last race in 1988. He won a total of 5,592 races. Frömming's major racing wins include three Prix d'Amérique and four Elitloppet victories. He was the German driving champion 11 times in a row from 1934 to 1944 and again in 1947 and 1948. In 1950 and 1953 Frömming tied the title with Gerhard Krüger.

== Awards and honors ==
During World War II Frömming employed three Jewish horsemen on his farm outside Berlin and hid them from the Nazi authorities. He was later honored for his action by B'nai B'rith International in New York City. In 1972 Frömming received the Order of Merit of the Federal Republic of Germany. He was nominated to the Germany's Sports Hall of Fame in 2008.

The Johannes Frömming Memorial is raced annually at the Bahrenfeld Racetrack in Hamburg. There is a street named for him near the former Hamburg race track Farmsen.

== Major racing victories ==
Germany

- Deutsches Traber-Derby – Xifra (1933), Adriatica (1940), Alwa (1941), Stella Maris (1943), Avanti (1947), Docht (1951), Dom (1953), Ditmarsia (1961), Salesiana (1965), Kurio (1972), Alsterhof (1974)

Austria

- Graf Kalman Hunyady Memorial – Xiphias (1936), Peter von Lurup (1938), Iltis (1943), Van der Hölgy (1944), Ejadon (1953), Eileen Eden (1970)
- Österreichisches Traber-Derby – Van der Hölgy (1942), Kaaba (1944), Damara S (1976), Daniel (1977)

Denmark

- Copenhagen Cup – Eidelstedter (1962)

France

- Prix d'Amérique – Nike Hanover (1964), Ozo (1965), Delmonica Hanover (1974)
- Prix de France – Elma (1966)

Italy

- Campionato Europeo – Hit Song (1955), Eileen Eden (1968, 1969, 1970)
- Gran Premio Lotteria – Eileen Eden (1968, 1969)

Sweden

- Elitloppet – Eidelstedter (1962), Elma (1965), Eileen Eden (1968, 1970)
- Åby Stora Pris – Ejadon (1955)

United States

- Challenge Cup – Nike Hanover (1964)

== Sources ==
- Germany's Trotting Hall of Fame (in German)
- Germany's Sports Hall of Fame (in German)
