= Gigant Neo =

Swedish Standardbred racehorse

- Breed: Standardbred
- Sire: Super Arnie
- Grandsire: Super Bowl
- Dam: Clorita Lobell
- Maternal grandsire: Speedy Crown
- Sex: Stallion
- Foaled: 17 May 1998
- Died: 20 October 2021
- Country: Sweden
- Colour: Bay
- Breeder: Nils-Erik Ohlsson, C & M Olsson
- Owner: Stall T.Z. & Lövis
- Trainer: Stefan Melander

Record
- 63: 32-8-3

Earnings
- US$2,596,145

Major wins
- Konung Gustaf V:s Pokal (2002); Prix d'Amérique (2006)

Awards
- Three-year-old of the Year Award (Sweden) (2001)
- Last updated on: 2009-03-18.

Gigant Neo (17 May 1998 – 20 October 2021) was a Swedish breeding stallion and racing trotter by Super Arnie out of Clorita Lobell by Speedy Crown.

His most prestigious victories included the Konung Gustaf V:s Pokal (2001), Grand Criterium de Vitesse (2003) and Prix d'Amérique (2006). At the end of his career, the stallion had earned US$2,596,145. Gigant Neo was trained by Swedish trotting trainer Stefan Melander, and driven by Jorma Kontio, Jean-Michel Bazire, Dominiek Locqueneux, Joseph Verbeeck and trainer Melander himself. Gigant Neo won the 3-year-old of the Year Award in Sweden in 2001.

== Victory in Prix d'Amérique ==
In 2006, Gigant Neo raced his fourth Prix d'Amérique, arguably the most prestigious trotting event in Europe. He had made attempts to claim the title the three previous years, without success. He came fairly close in 2005, when he finished second behind French Jag de Bellouet.

In the 2006 Prix d'Amérique, the field was recalled three times, and one horse lost his driver and went loose on the track. Gigant Neo took the lead in the fourth starting attempt. Soon, reigning champion and favourite Jag de Bellouet went up front while second favourite Kazire de Guez was parked outside. In the stretch, Kazire du Guez broke stride, and Jag de Bellouet won by two lengths before Gigant Neo.

A little more than a month after the race, it was announced that Jag de Bellouet had been disqualified due to a failed doping test. Traces of tolfenamic acid, an anti-inflammatory substance, had been discovered. As a result, Gigant Neo become the new winner of the title and US$600,000, which was the winner's share of the purse in 2006's edition of the richest trotting race in Europe. Upon getting the news, Gigant Neo's trainer Melander was shocked and reacted by sitting down on a hay bale, staring straight forward.

== Pedigree ==
Pedigree of Gigant Neo (Sweden)
Sire Super Arnie	Super Bowl (United States)	Star's Pride (United States)	Worthy Boy (United States)
Sire Super Arnie	Super Bowl (United States)	Star's Pride (United States)	Star Drift (United States)
Sire Super Arnie	Super Bowl (United States)	Pillow Talk (United States)	Rodney (United States)
Sire Super Arnie	Super Bowl (United States)	Pillow Talk (United States)	Bewitch (United States)
Sire Super Arnie	Arnies Likeness (United States)	Arnie Almahurst (United States)	Speedy Scot (United States)
Sire Super Arnie	Arnies Likeness (United States)	Arnie Almahurst (United States)	Ambitious Blaze (United States)
Sire Super Arnie	Arnies Likeness (United States)	Picture Dart (United States)	Dartmouth (United States)
Sire Super Arnie	Arnies Likeness (United States)	Picture Dart (United States)	Picturesque (United States)
Dam Clorita Lobell	Speedy Crown (United States)	Speedy Scot (United States)	Speedster (United States)
Dam Clorita Lobell	Speedy Crown (United States)	Speedy Scot (United States)	Scotch Love (United States)
Dam Clorita Lobell	Speedy Crown (United States)	Missile Toe (United States)	Florican (United States)
Dam Clorita Lobell	Speedy Crown (United States)	Missile Toe (United States)	Worth A Plenty (United States)
Dam Clorita Lobell	Countess Advocate (United States)	Speedy Count (United States)	Speedster (United States)
Dam Clorita Lobell	Countess Advocate (United States)	Speedy Count (United States)	Countess Song (United States)
Dam Clorita Lobell	Countess Advocate (United States)	Lovie Hanover (United States)	Star's Pride
Dam Clorita Lobell	Countess Advocate (United States)	Lovie Hanover (United States)	Lovely Hanover
