= Copenhagen Cup (harness racing) =

- Class: Group One International
- Location: (Denmark) Charlottenlund Racetrack, Copenhagen
- Inaugurated: 1928
- Race type: Harness race for standardbred trotters
- Website: Charlottenlund Travbane

Race information
- Distance: 2,011 meters
- Track: 1,000 meter track
- Qualification: Invitational
- Purse: 750,000 DKK (winner)

Copenhagen Cup is an international Group One harness racing event at the Charlottenlund Racetrack in Copenhagen, Denmark.

The race was established in 1928 and it was known as Internationalt Mesterskap (International Championship) until 1966. Since 1975 Copenhagen Cup has been held annually on the second weekend of June.

The distance has varied throughout the years, from 1978 it has been 2011 metres. In 1949 International Mesterskap consisted of two races.

== Winners ==
Year	Horse^{1}	Driver	Winning time
2022	(Belgium) Mister F Daag	Robin Bakker	1:11,5a
2021	(Sweden) Cyber Lane	Johan Untersteiner	1:10,9a
2020	(Netherlands) Heart of Steel	Peter Untersteiner	1:12,3a
2019	(Sweden) Handsome Brad	Carl Johan Jepson	1:11,4a
2018	(Sweden) Cyber Lane	Johan Untersteiner	1:11,4a
2017	(Sweden) Cruzado Dela Noche	Per Linderoth	1:11,1a
2016	(Sweden) Your Highness	Björn Goop	1:11,5a
2015	(Italy) Robert Bi	Robin Bakker	1:10,0a
2014	(Denmark) Orali	Jeppe Juel	1:12,1a
2013	(Sweden) Mr. Picolit	Åke Svanstedt	1:11,7a
2012	(Denmark) Wishing Stone	Jeppe Juel	1:11,3a
2011	(Italy) Libeccio Grif	Björn Goop	1:10,7a
2010	(Germany) Nu Pagadi	Erik Adielsson	1:11,7a
2009	(Sweden) Triton Sund	Örjan Kihlström	1:12,8a
2008	(Italy) Ghibellino	Roberto Andreghetti	1:12,4a
2007	(France) Kool du Caux	Jean-Michel Bazire	1:12,0a
2006	(France) Mara Bourbon	Jean-Pierre Dubois	1:12,2a
2005	(Norway) Steinlager	Per-Oleg Midtfjeld	1:13,5a
2004	(Sweden) Revenue	Lutfi Kolgjini	1:12,6a
2003	(Sweden) Gidde Palema	Åke Svanstedt	1:13,5a
2002	(Denmark) Legendary Lover K	Steen Juul	1:12,7a
2001	(Sweden) Victory Tilly	Stig H. Johansson	1:13,4a
2000	(Finland) Indian Silver	Stig H. Johansson	1:12,8a
1999	(France) Giesolo de Lou	Jean-Etinne Dubois	1:13,5a
1998	(United States) Moni Maker	Wally Hennessy	1:12,6a
1997	(Sweden) Zoogin	Åke Svanstedt	1:14,1a
1996	(United States) Triple T Storm	Joseph Verbeeck	1:14,1a
1995	(United States) S J's Photo	David Wade	1:12,8a
1994	(Sweden) Bolets Igor	David Wade	1:13,2a
1993	(Germany) Campo Ass	Wilhelm Paal	1:14,6a
1992	(Sweden) Bravo Sund	Jorma Kontio	1:14,9a
1991	(Germany) Glass Hanover	Helmut Beckemeyer	1:14,5a
1990	(Denmark) Meadow Roland	Preben Kjærsgaard	1:13,5a
1989	(Denmark) Meadow Roland	Preben Kjærsgaard	1:14,6a
1988	(Denmark) Meadow Roland	Preben Kjærsgaard	1:14,4a
1987	(Sweden) Hairos	John K. Hansen	1:14,0a
1986	(Denmark) Junior Lobell	John K. Hansen	1:13,6a
1985	(France) Minou du Donjon	Olle Goop	1:14,0a
1984	(France) Lutin d'Isigny	Jean-Paul André	1:13,8a
1983	(Sweden) E.O. Brunn	Bo W. Takter	1:13,9a
1982	(France) Ideal du Gazeau	Eugène Lefèvre	1:14,0a
1981	(France) Jorky	Leopold Verroken	1:16,3a
1980	(France) Ideal du Gazeau	Eugène Lefèvre	1:14,6a
1979	(Finland) Charme Asserdal	Heikki Korpi	1:15,5a
1978	(Sweden) Pershing	Berndt Lindstedt	1:14,2a
1977	(United States) Keystone Pioneer	William Haughton	1:15,0a
1976	(Sweden) Wiretapper	Sören Nordin	1:17,2a
1975	(Sweden) Ritha Lyngholm	Olle Lindquist	1:18,0a
1966	(France) Roquepine	Jean-René Gougeon	1:16,9a
1964	(United States) Elaine Rodney	Jean-René Gougeon	1:15,4a
1962	(Germany) Eidelstedter	Johannes Frömming	1:21,0
1961	(Sweden) Rulle Rappson	Sören Nordin	1:21,4
1960	(France) Hairos II	Willem Geersen	1:17,0a
1959	(Norway) Jens Protector	Trygve Diskerud	1:16,3a
1958	(Sweden) Adept	Kurt Mattson	1:21,5
1957	(France) Gelinotte	Charlie Mills	1:18,7
1952	(Sweden) Frances Bulwark	Sören Nordin	1:22,3
1951	(Sweden) Rollo	Ragnar Thorngren	1:17,8
1949	(Sweden) Presidenten (Denmark) Casino The Great	Folke Bengtsson; Fredi Sølberg	1:23,1; 1:22,7
1948	(Norway) Harvest Druien	Niels Jan Koster	1:23,8
1946	(Denmark) Future	Aage Kristoffersen	1:19,9
1939	(Denmark) Sonny Diamond	Niels Jan Koster	1:21,1
1938	(Sweden) Sir Walter Scott	Calle Schoug	1:22,1
1932	(Germany) Walter Dear	Charlie Mills	1:19,6
1931	(Germany) Walter Dear	Charlie Mills	1:18,4
1928	(Germany) Guy Bacon	Charlie Mills	1:19,4

^{1} Country of owner

== Brief History of Harness Racing ==
The history of Harness Racing has its roots in the horse racing that began in the 20th century with regular horses, the race also known as trotting. It flourished simultaneously in North America, Russia, France, The Netherlands, Italy and Norway. The sport made its debut with average local breeds, which were working horses. It is said that North America was the mother of Harness Racing.

It is believed that harness racing that kicked off on a full scale onwards of 1806 in America, gradually developed from locally organized races between the working class farmers with ordinary working farm horses. Following such events, horses bred for farm work were replaced with horses specially bred for speed and stamina.

== See also ==
- List of Scandinavian harness horse races

== Sources ==
- Charlottenlund Travbane/Copenhagen Cup
