= Charlie Mills (harness racer) =

German horse racer and trainer (1888–1972)

Charlie Mills (23 November 1888 in Hamburg – 7 June 1972 in Switzerland) was a German harness racing driver and trainer of an Irish descent.

Mills was one of the most legendary harness racers in Europe during his long career that lasted from the 1900s to the early 1960s. He gained a total of 4 364 victories as a driver, trainer or breeder. Mills had a great influence on the development of German harness racing before World War II. Two of his most famous horses were the American bred Walter Dear and French Gelinotte.

Mills was born as one of the six sons of an Irish horse trainer Anthony Mills. His father came to Germany for working as a trainer at the newly opened Bahrenfeld race track in Hamburg. Charlie soon started to drive himself and won his first race in 1903 at Berlin. In 1931 he started a stud farm named Gestüt Lindenhof in Templin, Brandenburg with a Jewish publisher and horse breeder Bruno Cassirer, who later emigrated to Britain. In 1935, Mills acquired another stud farm in Kremmen. After the war Mills moved to France in 1947 and had a farm at Senlis, north of Paris. Charlie Mills spent his last years in Switzerland where he died at the age of 83.

In 1966, Mills made a short appearance in a French comedy Le Caïd de Champignol by Jean Bastia. The film was shot in Senlis.

== Major racing victories ==
Germany

- Deutsches Traber-Derby – Raute (1910), Zora (1925), Lebenskünstler (1926), Plutarch (1934), Probst (1935), Fried (1937), Leo (1938), Dachs (1939), Missouri (1942)

Austria

- Österreichisches Traber-Derby – Baka (1919), Plunger jr (1920), Vickerl (1927)
- Graf Kalman Hunyady-Gedenkrennen – Tizian (1929), Walter Dear (1931), Rama (1937), Gelinotte (1957)

France

- Prix d'Amérique – Walter Dear (1934), Gélinotte (1956, 1957)
- Critérium des 3 ans – Élope (1951), Luth Grandchamp (1958)
- Critérium des 4 ans – Bleinheim (1949), Chambon (1950), Élope (1952), Gelinotte (1954), Kimono Royal (1958)
- Critérium des 5 ans – Volcano (1948), Agramant (1949), Enfant des Houlles (1953), Fortunato II (1954)

Italy

- Gran Premio Lotteria – Gelinotte (1956)

Sweden

- Elitloppet – Gelinotte (1956, 1957)
- Åby Stora Pris – Gelinotte (1956, 1957)

Danmark

- Copenhagen Cup – Guy Bacon (1928), Walter Dear (1931, 1932), Gelinotte (1957)

== Sources ==
- Hall of Fame – Deutscher Travsport
