= Graf Kalman Hunyady Memorial =

Graf Kalman Hunyady Memorial (German: Graf Kalman Hunyady-Gedenkrennen) is an annual harness racing event at the Krieau Race Track in Vienna, Austria.

The race was established in 1898. In 1901, it was named after the late count Kálmán Hunyady de Kéthely (1828–1901), who was the first president of the Vienna Harness Racing Club (Wiener Trabrenn-Verein). Graf Kalman Hunyady Memorial is one of the oldest international harness races in Europe.

== Winners 1898–2025 ==
Year	Horse	Driver	Winning time
2025	(Germany) Toto Barosso	Peter Untersteiner (Austria)	1:13,3a
2024	(Germany) Yahoo Diamant	Michael Nimczyk (Germany)	1:13,1a – New Race Record
2023	(Sweden) Lozano Boko	Christoph Fischer (Austria)	1:13,7a
2022	(France) Hooper des Chasses	Rudi Haller	1:13,9a
2021	(Sweden) Night Brodde	Conrad Lugauer	1:13,9a
2020	(Sweden) Prosperous	Jaap van Rijn	1:14,2a
2019	(Germany) Orlando Jet	Rudi Haller	1:14,3a
2018	(Sweden) Breidabliks Nubbe	Marc Elias	1:13,9a
2017	(Germany) Tyrolean Dream	Rudi Haller	1:14,8a
2016	(Italy) Stark Bi	Rudi Haller	1:14,3a
2015	(Germany) Oncoming Diamant	Detflef Fleischer	1:14,7a
2014	(Denmark) Solo Nolo	Hubert Brandstatter Jr	1:15,3a
2013	(Germany) Freeman T. Porter	Conrad Lugauer	1:13,8a
2012	(Italy) Lotar Bi	Alessandro Raspante	1:14,6a
2011	(Netherlands) Venividivici Joe	Hugo Langeweg Jr	1:14,0a
2010	(Netherlands) Wellington	Hugo Langeweg Jr	1:15,0a
2009	(Austria) Rocket Power	Gregor Krenmayr	1:15,9a
2008	(Sweden) Opal Viking	Jorma Kontio	1:14,6a
2007	(Sweden) Opal Viking	Jorma Kontio	1:14,0a
2006	(Belgium) Isn't It Pacha	Laurent Coubard	1:14,5a
2005	(Germany) Oak General	Manfred Schub	1:14,7a
2004	(Germany) Oak General	Manfred Schub	1:16,2a
2003	(Germany) Time of Change	Gerhard Biendl	1:13,8a
2002	(France) Fontaine du Poli	Bernard Piton	1:16,5a
2001	(Germany) Normal Bes	Josef Franzl	1:15,4a
2000	(Finland) Mr Claude	Jorma Kontio	1:16,4a
1999	(France) Giesolo de Lou	Jean-Etienne Dubois	1:14,1a
1998	(Finland) Tornando	Jorma Kontio	1:16,3a
1997	(Sweden) Carl Otto	Leif Witasp	1:15,8a
1996	(Finland) Jonas Laukko	Ari Kela	1:17,1a
1995	(Finland) Jonas Laukko	Ari Kela	1:17,5a
1994	(France) Upero	Jean-Etienne Dubois	1:16,8a
1993	(Sweden) Queen L.	Stig H. Johansson	1:16,8a
1992	(Sweden) Leroy Broline	Jim Frick	1:16,8a
1991	(Sweden) Bowspirit	Lars Lindberg	1:16,9a
1990	(Sweden) Piper Cub	Stig Engberg	1:15,7a
1989	(Germany) Herkules	Rudi Haller	1:18,5a
1988	(Sweden) Inkasso Bank	Karl O. Johansson	1:18,3a
1987	(Sweden) Hej Flight	Jörn-Mårten Kvikstad	1:17,4a
1986	(Sweden) Regal Bunter	Sven Berggren	1:18,8a
1985	(Denmark) Ellizar H.	Bo W. Takter	1:16,9a
1984	(Sweden) Meadow Road	Torbjörn Jansson	1:17,2a
1983	(Sweden) Micado C.	Ulf Nordin	1:19,5a
1982	(Sweden) Mustard	Ulf Nordin	1:17,2a
1981	(Finland) Super Male	Markku Vartiainen	1:20,4a
1980	(France) Igor du Beauvoisin	Micel Rousell	1:19,0a
1979	(France) Ejakval	Jean-Claude David	1:18,6a
1978	(Finland) Uno Boy	Veijo Heiskanen	1:17,5a
1977	(Germany) Granit	Gerhard Krüger	1:17,8a
1976	(Germany) Granit	Gerhard Krüger	
1975	(Sweden) Chaco S.	Hans Svensson	1:19,5a
1974	(France) Florestan	Gerhard Krüger	1:21,9a
1973	(Sweden) Bums Stuart	Olle Lindqvist	1:21,2a
1972	(Sweden) Lyon	Olle Elfstrand	1:20,4a
1971	(France) Uburoi S		1:20,8a
1970	(Italy) Eileen Eden	Johannes Frömming	1:18,5a
1969	(France) Uvaria	Michel Gougeon	1:20,5a
1968	(France) Ted Grez		
1967	(Sweden) Kentucky Fibber	Knut Lindblom	1.21,2a
1966	(Sweden) Porthos	Bertil Rogell	1:20,8a
1965	(France) Oscar R.L.	Henri Levesque	1:19,8a
1964	(France) Nisos H		
1963	(France) Nisos H		
1962	(France) Hetman		
1961	(France) Ivacourt	Gerhard Krüger	
1960	(France) Jambe D'Argent D		
1959	(Austria) Tunkum		
1958	(France) Ica VI		
1957	(France) Gelinotte	Charlie Mills	
1956	(Sweden) Smaragd		
1955	(Sweden) Gay Noon		
1954	(Austria) Marliebherr		
1953	(France) Ejadon	Johannes Frömming	
1952	(Germany) Permit	Walter Heitmann	
1951	(Austria) Mary Hanover		
1950	(Austria) Leopard		
1949	(Austria) Hermit		
1948	(Austria) Gitalo		
1947	Urál		
1946	Cifra		
1946	Urál		
1945	Not run		
1944	(Nazi Germany) Van der Hölgy	Johannes Frömming	
1943	(Nazi Germany) Iltis	Johannes Frömming	
1942	(Austria) Athos		
1941	(Austria) Athos		
1940	(Austria) Kama Deva II		
1939	(Austria) Amos		
1938	(Nazi Germany) Peter von Lurup	Johannes Frömming	
1937	(Nazi Germany) Rama	Charlie Mills	
1936	(Nazi Germany) Xiphias	Johannes Frömming	
1935	(Austria) Galtee More		
1934	(Austria) Nervus Rerum		
1933	(Austria) Primavera		
1932	(Austria) Heinrich	Johnny Raymer	
1931	(Germany) Walter Dear	Charlie Mills	
1930	(United States) Hazleton		
1929	(Germany) Tizian	Charlie Mills	
1928	(Austria) Xenophon		
1927	Első		
1926	(Austria) Adonis		
1925	(Austria) Venus		
1924	(Austria) Coriolanus	Johnny Raymer	
1923	Aqua Viva		
1922	(Austria) Welser Edi		
1921	(Austria) Mimosa		
1920	(Austria) Gretl Maria		
1919	(Austria) Faustus		
1918	Not run		
1917	Jólesz		
1916	(Austria) Miss Zealous Caid		
1915	(Austria) Bellkelly		
1914	Not run		
1913	(Austria) Pierrot		
1912	(Austria) Hammurabi		
1911	(Austria) Plauderlieschen		
1910	(Austria) Allein		
1909	(Austria) Indiana		
1908	(Austria) Liselotte		
1907	(Austria) Countesse Caid		
1906	(Austria) Ama Z		
1905	(Austria) Lora		
1904	(Austria) Tutti		
1903	Holló		
1902	(Austria) Enamel		
1901	(Austria) Tilly		
1900	(United States) Mary C		
1899	Donaudorf		
1898	(Austria) Princesse Nefta		

== Sources ==
- Graf Hunyady Memorial Classic Races
- Graf Kalman Hunyady-Gedenkrennen Kurt Anderssons Travsida
