= Trabrennbahn Krieau =

Harness racing track in Vienna, Austria

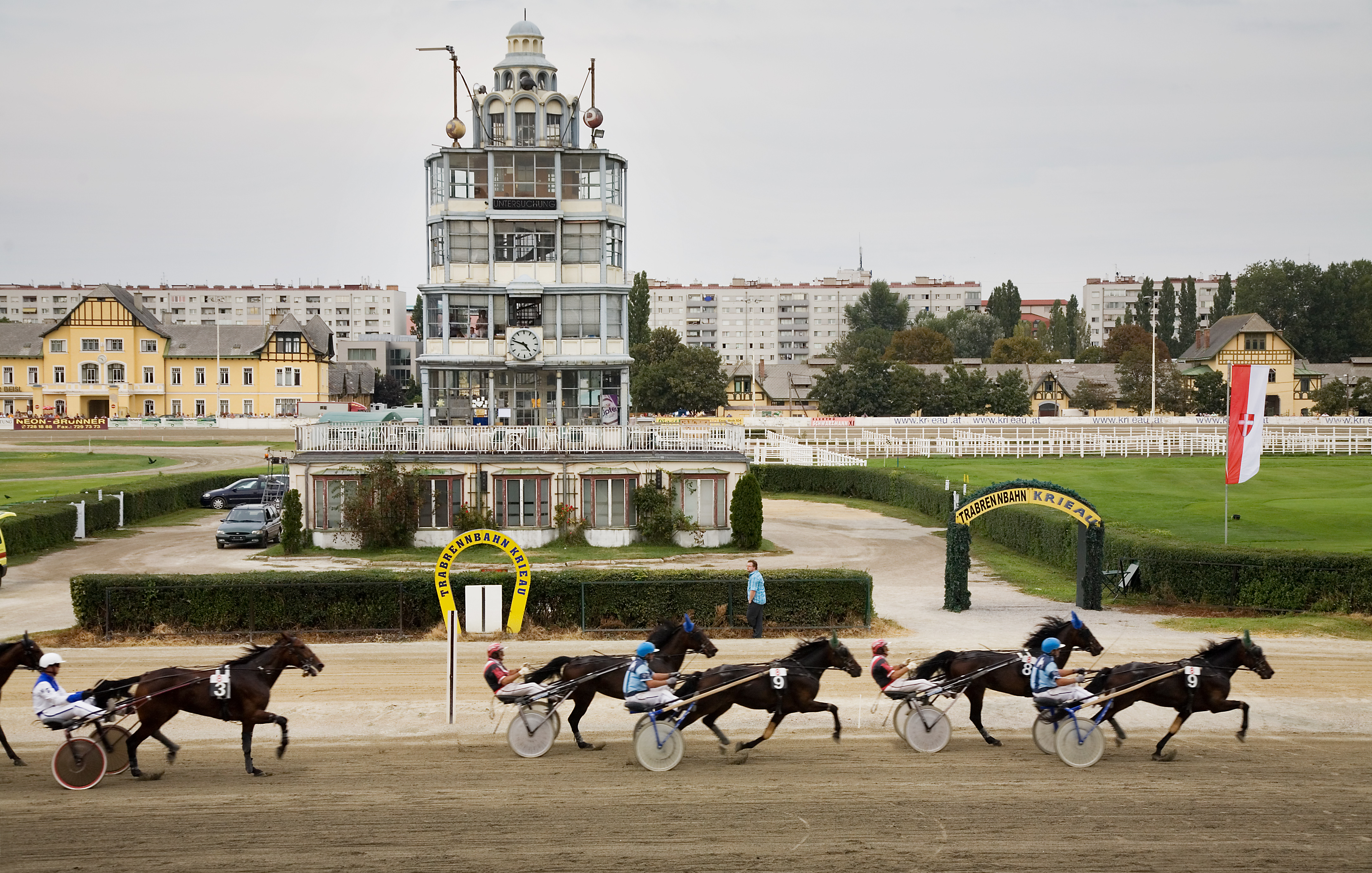
- Location: Nordportalstraße 247, Vienna, Austria
- Coordinates: 48.21055°N 16.414347°E
- Owned by: Wiener Trabrenn-Verein
- Date opened: September 29, 1878; 146 years ago
- Race type: harness racing
- Notable races: Österreichisches Traber-Derby; Graf Kalman Hunyady Memorial

The Trabrennbahn Krieau (Krieau Trotting Track), also known as the Trabrennplatz, is a horse racing track in the Krieau, a part of Vienna's Leopoldstadt district. The Prater, a large public park, lies immediately to the southwest of the Trabrennbahn Krieau. The Trabrennbahn Krieau opened on 29 September, 1878. The old grandstand and a tower for officials were finished in 1913. The Trabrennbahn Krieau is the second oldest harness racing track in Europe; only the Central Moscow Hippodrome, completed in 1834, is older.

Major annual racing events held at the Trabrennbahn Krieau are the Österreichisches Traber-Derby, which began in 1884, and the Graf Kalman Hunyady Memorial, which has been held since 1901. The Trabrennbahn Krieau is also used as a concert venue, and has hosted artists like Avicii, Robbie Williams, Green Day, and Bon Jovi.

On 11 September 1931, Austrian Chancellor Engelbert Dollfuß gave a speech, the so-called Trabrennplatzrede, at the Trabrennbahn.

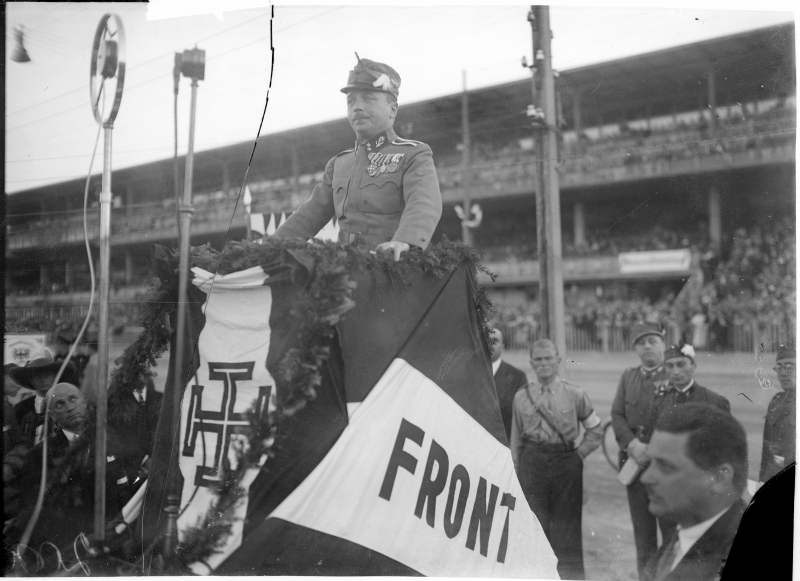
Engelbert Dollfuß's Trabrennplatzrede

The Trabrennbahn has also been used for motor racing. On 7 April 1935, a 23-year-old Austrian mechanic and racer named Hans (or possibly Johann) Pelikan crashed into a concrete barrier while attempting test laps on a motorcycle, and died within minutes. Pelikan was intending to compete in the Austria-Goldpokal race being held that day.
