= Frances Bulwark =

Swedish Standardbred racehorse

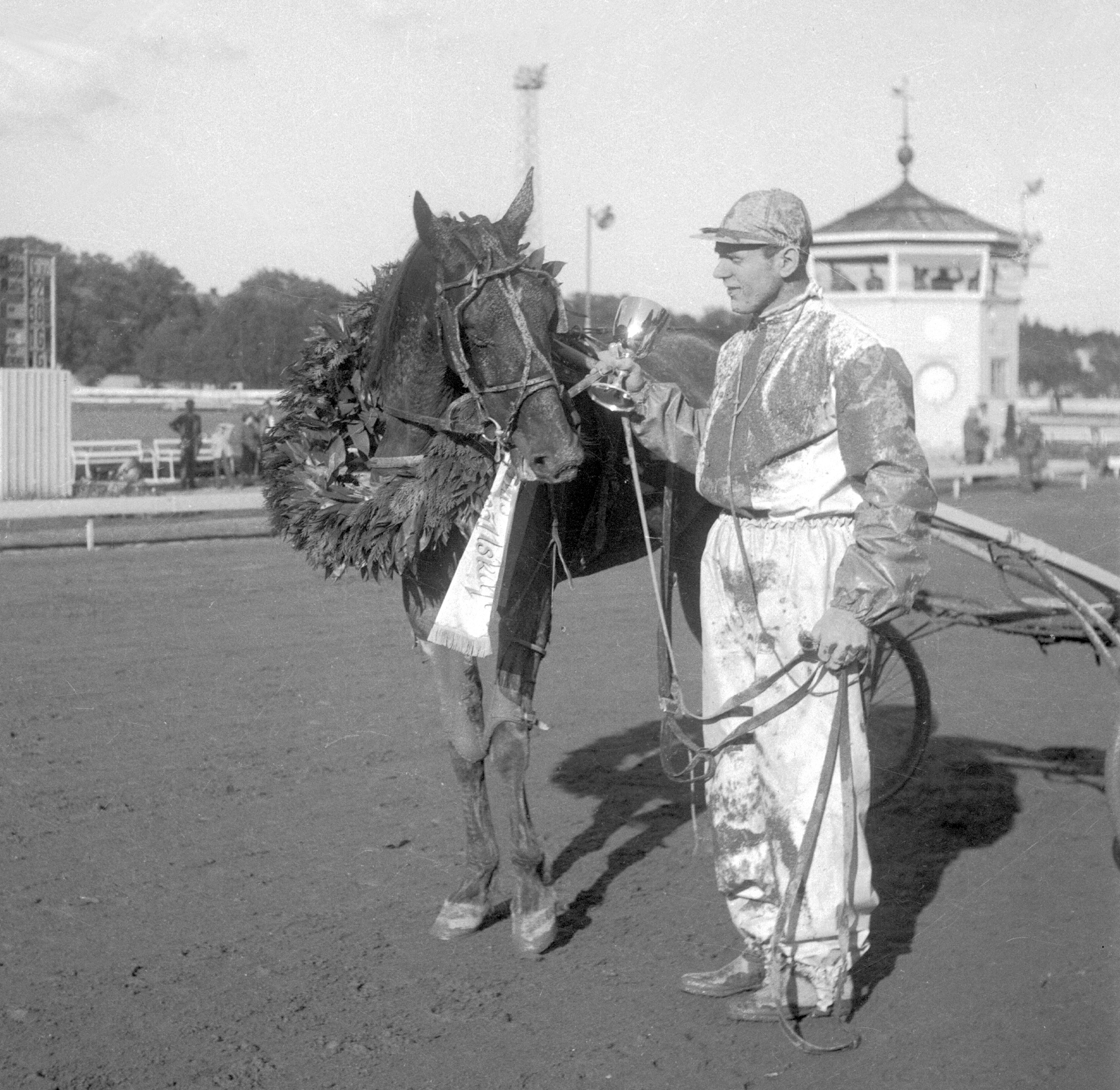
- Frances Bulwark and Sören Nordin in 1953
- Breed: Standardbred
- Sire: Bulwark
- Grandsire: Volomite
- Dam: Frances Great
- Maternal grandsire: Kaffir Axworthy
- Sex: Mare
- Foaled: 5 April 1945
- Country: Sweden
- Colour: Bay
- Breeder: Martin Eklund
- Owner: Väsby Stuteri
- Trainer: Sören Nordin

Record
- 130: 80-21-12

Earnings
- SEK591,420

Major wins
- Swedish Championships (Sweden) (1950, 1951, 1953, 1954, 1955, 1956); Scandinavian Championship (Denmark) (Norway) (Sweden) (1950, 1952, 1953, 1954, 1955); Åby Stora Pris (Sweden) (1950); Gran Premio delle Nazioni (Italy) (1952); Elitloppet (Sweden) (1953)
- Last updated on: 2009-03-17.

Frances Bulwark (born 5 April 1945) was a Swedish Standardbred racing trotter and brood mare by Bulwark out of Frances Great by Kaffir Axworthy.

Her most prestigious victories include six Swedish Championships (1950–51, 1953–56), five Scandinavian Championships (1950, 1952-1955), Åby Stora Pris (1950), Gran Premio delle Nazioni (1952) and Elitloppet (1953). At the end of her career, the mare had earned SEK591,420. Frances Bulwark was trained by successful Swedish trainer Sören Nordin, with whom the mare won 74 races, more than any other of Nordin's horses. Nordin considered Frances Bulwark to be the best among the horses he trained during his career.

== Pedigree ==
Pedigree of Frances Bulwark (Sweden)
| Sire Bulwark (United States) | Volomite (United States) | Peter Volo (United States) | Peter the Great (United States) |
| Sire Bulwark (United States) | Volomite (United States) | Peter Volo (United States) | Nervolo Belle (United States) |
| Sire Bulwark (United States) | Volomite (United States) | Cita Frisco (United States) | San Francisco (United States) |
| Sire Bulwark (United States) | Volomite (United States) | Cita Frisco (United States) | Mendocita (United States) |
| Sire Bulwark (United States) | Sister Guy (United States) | Guy Axworthy (United States) | Axworthy (United States) |
| Sire Bulwark (United States) | Sister Guy (United States) | Guy Axworthy (United States) | Lillian Wilkes (United States) |
| Sire Bulwark (United States) | Sister Guy (United States) | Sister Bingen (United States) | Bingen (United States) |
| Sire Bulwark (United States) | Sister Guy (United States) | Sister Bingen (United States) | Sis Directum (United States) |
| Dam Frances Great (United States) | Kaffir Axworthy (United States) | Guy Axworthy (United States) | Axworthy (United States) |
| Dam Frances Great (United States) | Kaffir Axworthy (United States) | Guy Axworthy (United States) | Lillian Wilkes (United States) |
| Dam Frances Great (United States) | Kaffir Axworthy (United States) | Aurora Dillon | |
| Dam Frances Great (United States) | Belle Dant (United States) | Peter the Great (United States) | Pilot Medium (United States) |
| Dam Frances Great (United States) | Belle Dant (United States) | Peter the Great (United States) | Santos (United States) |
