= Lotteria (disambiguation) =

Lotteria may mean:

- Lotteria, a fast-food chain
- Gran Premio Lotteria, a horse-racing event often called the Lotteria
- Lotería, a Latino board game played with cards
