= Ourasi =

French Trotter racehorse

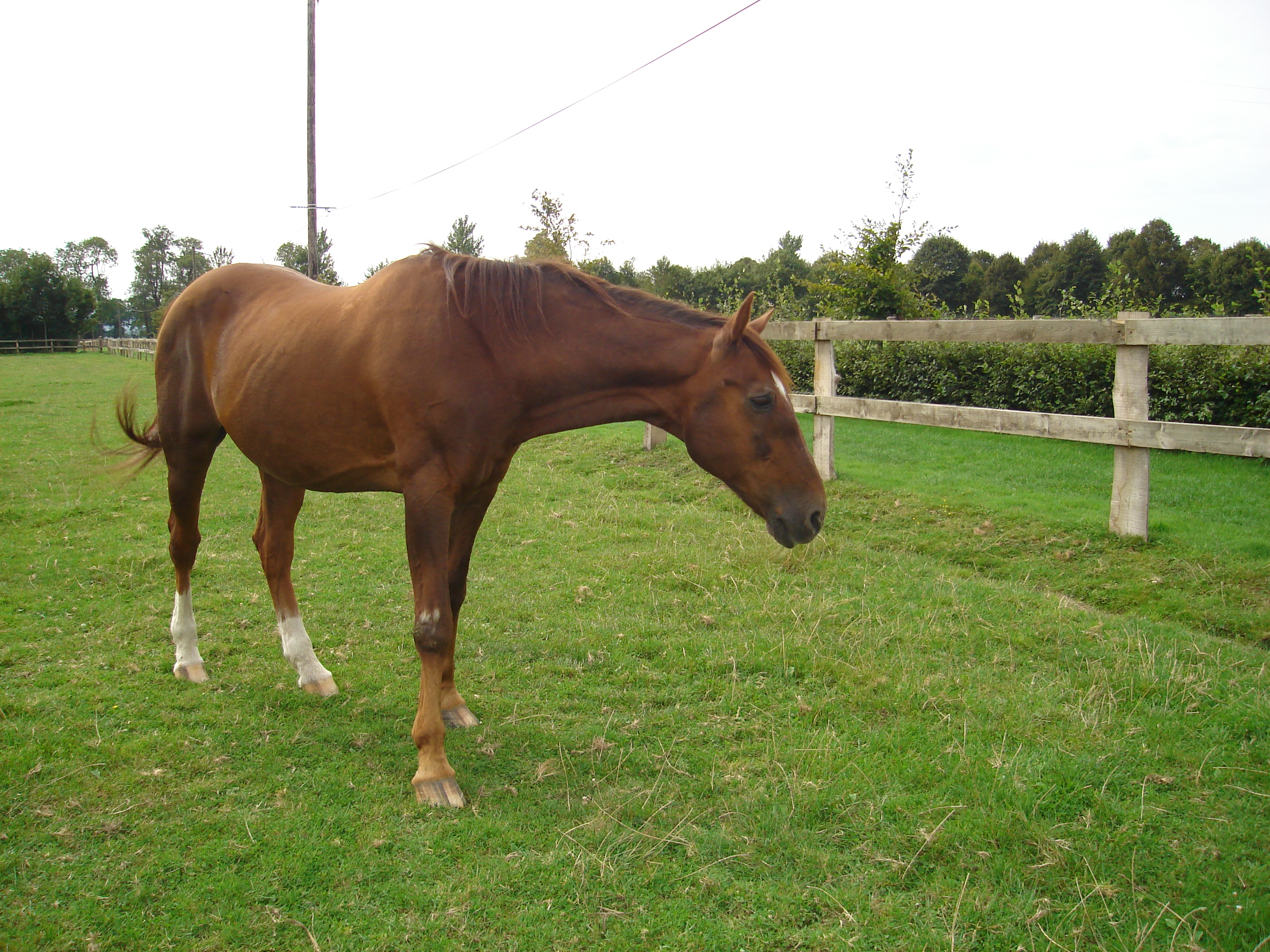
- Breed: French Trotter
- Sire: Greyhound
- Grandsire: Ura
- Dam: Fleurasie
- Damsire: Remember
- Sex: Stallion
- Foaled: 1980
- Died: January 12, 2013
- Country: France
- Colour: Chestnut
- Breeder: Raoul Ostheimer
- Trainer: Jean-René Gougeon
- Rider: Jean-René Gougeon
- Record: 1'11"5

Ourasi (7 April 1980 – 12 January 2013) was a chestnut French Trotter. He earned $2,913,314 during his career. His harness racing victories included three consecutive Prix d'Amérique at Vincennes, the second by approximately 18 lengths. Ourasi is considered to be the horse of the century. He won more than 50 consecutive races. Jean-René Gougeon (who died in July 2008), his trainer and driver, won the "Prix d'Amérique" with Ourasi 3 times. Ourasi won the "Prix d'Amérique" a fourth time with Michel "Minou" Gougeon (the brother of Jean René Gougeon) as driver.

== Background ==
Ourasi was born at the Haras de Saint-Georges, in Saint-Étienne-l'Allier, into a small stud belonging to Raoul Ostheimer and Rachel Tessier. He was sired by Greyhound F out of Fleurasie by Remember F (his sire was not the illustrious American trotter of the same name).

== Racing record ==
When Ourasi was 2 years old, he made his racing debut. He was trained by Rachel Ostheimer and driven by Raoul Ostheimer, who was deaf.

At the beginning of 1989, when Ourasi was 9 years old and trying to win his fourth Prix d'Amérique, the French president, François Mitterrand, came to see the race. Few expected Ourasi to lose. However, he finished third behind "Queila Gédé" and "Potin d'Amour".

On January 28, 1990, Ourasi broke the Prix d'Amérique's record.

== Retirement ==
After mating with 130 mares from France, Scandinavia, and the United States, Ourasi produced only 8 foals from his first year at stud. Specialists were called from around the world, but nothing could be done, and within 10 years, Ourasi produced just 38 foals. None of these foals became champions.

== Death ==
On January 12, 2013, Ourasi was euthanized following a brief period of illness. According to Pierre Lamy, the owner of the farm where Ourasi was kept, he hadn't eaten for over 4 days and refused to sleep before being put down. He is buried at Haras de Gruchy in Calvados.

== Statue ==
In June 2014, a year after the death of Ourasi, a life-sized statue was unveiled at the Hippodrome de Vincennes in his honour. Created by sculptor Arnaud Kasper over the span of eight months, the monument weighs over 600 kg and stands at 2.20m tall. It was entirely financed by the Le Trot Company and revealed to the public on June 22 at 4 PM in the presence of Dominique de Bellaigue, president of Le Trot, and Michel "Minou" Gougeon, the rider who led Ourasi to his fourth Prix d'Amérique victory in 1990.

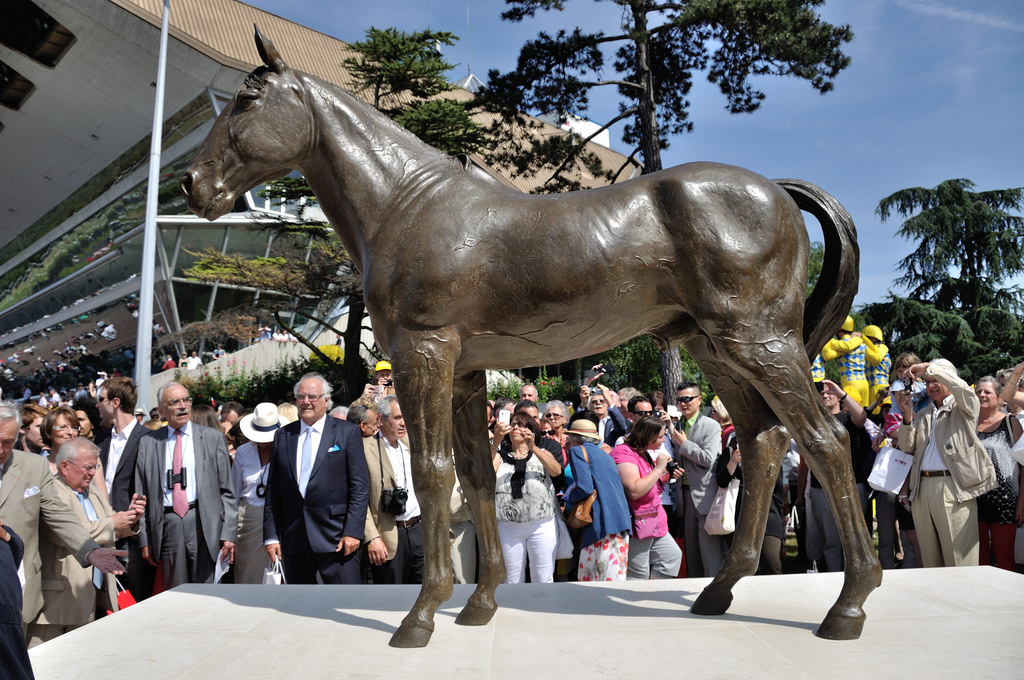
The Statue of Ourasi in 2014

== Major wins ==
=== Germany ===
- Elite-Rennen: 1986

=== France ===
- Prix d'Amérique: 1986, 1987, 1988, 1990
- Prix de France: 1986, 1987, 1988
- Grand Critérium de Vitesse de la Côte d'Azur: 1986, 1987, 1988, 1989
- Prix de Paris: 1989
- Prix de l'Étoile: 1985
- Prix René Ballière: 1986, 1988
- Critérium des 5 ans: 1985
- Critérium des Jeunes: 1983
- Prix de Bretagne: 1986
- Prix du Bourbonnais: 1985, 1986, 1988
- Prix de Bourgogne: 1987, 1988, 1989
- Prix de Belgique: 1986, 1987, 1988, 1989
- Prix de Washington: 1988
- Prix de Croix: 1985
- Prix d'Europe: 1985, 1986, 1988
- Prix Roederer: 1985
- Prix Kalmia: 1983
- Prix Robert Auvray: 1985
- Grand Prix du Sud-Ouest: 1987

=== Norway ===
- Oslo Grand Prix: 1989

== Main honourable mentions ==
=== United States ===
- March of Dimes Trot at Garden State Park : 2nd in 1988

=== France ===
- Prix d'Amérique: 3rd in 1989
- Prix de Bretagne: 2nd in 1985

== Pedigree ==
Pedigree of Ourasi
Sire Greyhound	Ura	Carioca II	Mousko Williams
Sire Greyhound	Ura	Carioca II	Quovaria
Sire Greyhound	Ura	Gelinotte	Kairos
Sire Greyhound	Ura	Gelinotte	Rhyticere
Sire Greyhound	Strada	Jamin	Abner
Sire Greyhound	Strada	Jamin	Dladys
Sire Greyhound	Strada	Etchida	Hernani III
Sire Greyhound	Strada	Etchida	Trita
Dam Fleurasie	Remembrer	Atus II	Hernani III
Dam Fleurasie	Remembrer	Atus II	Juignettes
Dam Fleurasie	Remembrer	Bredouille	Quiroga II
Dam Fleurasie	Remembrer	Bredouille	Stele
Dam Fleurasie	Tania du mont	L'X	Carioca II
Dam Fleurasie	Tania du mont	L'X	Uvette
Dam Fleurasie	Tania du mont	Moniqua II	Euripide
Dam Fleurasie	Tania du mont	Moniqua II	Igra
