= March of Dimes Trot =

1988 horse race

Coordinates: 39.926°N 75.037°W

The March of Dimes Trot was a Standardbredtrotting race that took place at Garden State Park Racetrack in New Jersey on November 17, 1988. It is considered one of the most legendary races in trotting history. The race was connected with March of Dimes charity foundation.

The idea of the race was a duel between American world-record-breaker Mack Lobell, who had just been sold to Sweden, and the famous French trotter Ourasi. Both horses had been racing in Europe but they had never met. The one-mile race also featured eight other horses from Europe and North America. Three of the European participants (Napoletano, Sugarcane Hanover and Friendly Face) were American-bred.

The race evoked great interest in Europe. More than 70 reporters had flown to cover the race. A four-hour television coverage was sent to France and the race was also broadcast in Sweden. Surprisingly only a crowd of 8,000 people showed up at the racetrack. Hundreds of them were from Europe.

Winner of the March of Dimes Trot was an American expatriate Sugarcane Hanover who was trained in Norway. Ourasi finished second and Mack Lobell who took the lead was third.

== Results ==
Pos	Country^{1}	Horse	Driver	Time	Prize
1	(Norway)	Sugarcane Hanover	Gunnar Eggen	1:11.6	$270 000
2	(France)	Ourasi	Jean-René Gougeon	1:11.6	$120 000
3	(Sweden)	Mack Lobell	John D Campbell	1:11.7	$72 000
4	(Sweden)	Napoletano	Stig H Johansson	1:11.8	$48 000
5	(United States)	Scenic Regal	Harold Story	1:12.2	$30 000
6	(Canada)	No Sex Please	Ron Waples	1:12.2	$12 000
7	(Italy)	Esotico Prad	Giuseppe Guzzinati	1:12.2	$12 000
8	(United States)	Go Get Lost	Tom Sells	1:12.2	
9	(Sweden)	Callit	Karl O Johansson	1:12.5	
10	(Finland)	Friendly Face	Pekka Korpi	1:12.6	

^{1} Country of the owner
