= Hambletonian Oaks =

- Location: Meadowlands Racing & Entertainment; East Rutherford, New Jersey (since 1981)
- Inaugurated: 1971 (55 years ago) at the DuQuoin State Fair, DuQuoin, Illinois
- Race type: Standardbred (Trot)
- Website: www.hambletonian.com

Race information
- Distance: 1 mile (8.0 furlongs)
- Surface: Dirt
- Track: Left-handed
- Qualification: three-year-old fillies
- Purse: $525,000 (2024)

The Hambletonian Oaks is a premier harness racing event for three-year-old Standardbred female trotters first run in 1971. The race is operated by The Hambletonian Society, Inc. which also operates the Hambletonian Stakes for three-year-old for male horses and the Breeders Crown series.

== Historical race events ==
The Hambletonian Society, Inc. is a Group Stakeholder of the Racing Medication and Testing Consortium (RMTC). Beginning in 1991, the Society's Board of Directors banned any horse from competing in the Hambletonioan Oaks using the either of the medications Butazolidin or Lasix.

In 2016, the driver and trainer combination of Yannick Gingras and Hall of Fame inductee Jimmy Takter set a record when they won the Oaks together for the third consecutive year. The team also won the 2017 Oaks, which made it the fourth consecutive year.

Only 6 of the 36 Hambletonian Oaks run through 2017 have been won by a trainer born in the United States. The foreign born winning trainers have come from Sweden (16), Canada (10), Norway (3) and New Zealand (1).

== Race locations ==
- 1971–1980: State Fair, DuQuoin, Illinois
- 1981–present: Meadowlands Racetrack, East Rutherford, New Jersey

== Records ==
Most wins by a driver

- 6 – Yannick Gingras (2014, 2015, 2016, 2017, 2018, 2020)

Most wins by an owner

- 3 – Marvin Katz & Alexander J. Libfeld (1998, 2008, 2016), Castleton Farm (1971, 1973, 1974)

Most wins by a trainer

- 7 – Jimmy Takter (1994, 2003, 2006, 2014, 2015, 2016, 2017, 2018)

Most wins by a groom

- 2 – Jim Summers (1985, 1997)

Stakes record

- 1:50.0 – Manchengo (2018)

== Winners of the Hambletonian Oaks ==
Year	Winner	Driver	Trainer	Groom	Owner	Time	Purse
2024	Warrawee Michelle	Åke Svanstedt	Åke Svanstedt		Åke Svanstedt Inc., Santandrea Inc., Young Guns	1:51 2/5	$525,000
2023	Heaven Hanover	Tim Tetrick	Marcus Melander		S R F Stable, AMG Stable Inc., Rick Wahlstedt, Heights Stable	1:50 3/5	$500,000
2022	Fashion Schooner	Tim Tetrick	Jim Campbell		Fashion Farms	1:51 2/5	$500,000
2021	Bella Bellini	Dexter Dunn	Richard Norman		David McDuffee	1:52 1/5	$500,000
2020^{[Note 1]}	Sorella	Yannick Gingras	Nancy Takter		Elmer Fannin, Crawford Farms Racing, Brent Fannin	1:52 2/5	$600,000
2019	When Dovescry	Simon Allard	Rene Allard		Go Fast Stable, Yves Sarrazin, Dumain Haven Farm, Singh & Soulsby	1:50 2/5	$500,000
2018	Manchego	Yannick Gingras	Jimmy Takter		Black Horse Racing, Lebanon, NJ	1:50 0/0	$500,000
2017	Ariana G	Yannick Gingras	Jimmy Takter		Marvin Katz & Alexander J. Libfeld	1:51 2/5	$500,000
2016	All The Time	Yannick Gingras	Jimmy Takter	Helene Engblom	Marvin Katz & Alexander J. Libfeld	1:52 1/5	$500,000
2015	Wild Honey	Yannick Gingras	Jimmy Takter	Alvaro Guerra	Christina Takter, Herb Liverman, John & Jim Fielding	1:52 2/5	$570,000
2014	Lifetime Pursuit	Yannick Gingras	Jimmy Takter	Daniel Guzman	Brittany Farms	1:50 4/5	$500,000
2013	Bee A Magician	Brian Sears	Richard "Nifty" Norman	Scott Petherick	Mel Hartman, Dave McDuffee & Herb Liverman	1:51 4/5	$570,000
2012	Personal Style	David Miller	Richard "Nifty" Norman	Robyn Norman	Brittany Farms & Melvin Hartman	1:53 1/5	$784,050
2011	Bold And Fresh	George Brennan	Doug Miller	Mike Holcman	Donald Bartling	1:53 1/5	$820,000
2010	Bar Slide	Tim Tetrick	Joe Holloway	Saul Fajardo	Bluestone Farms LLC	1:53 4/5	$750,000
2009	Broadway Schooner	Brian Sears	Jim Campbell	Walter Teat	Arlene & Jules Siegel	1:54 0/0	$923,042
2008	Creamy Mimi	Andy Miller	Trond Smedshammer	Rosanna Morales	Marvin Katz & Alexander J. Libfeld	1:53 4/5	$885,000
2007	Danae	Tim Tetrick	George Teague, Jr.	Brenda Teague	Rodney Mitchell & Teague Inc.	1:54 2/5	$850,000
2006	Passionate Glide	Ronald Pierce	Jimmy Takter	Kennet Glaas	Brittany Farms	1:54 3/5	$850,000
2005	Jalopy	Jeff Gregory	Jonas Czernyson	Caroline Berglund	Menhammer Stuteri	1:53 4/5	$850,000
2004	Silver Springs	George Brennan	Jan Johnson	Anne Forsberg	Jorgen Jahre Jr.	1:53 3/5	$550,000
2003	Southwind Allaire	Ronald Pierce	Jimmy Takter	Frida Wikstrom	Robert Anderson & David Wilmot	1:53 4/5	$575,000
2002	Windylane Hanover	Ronald Pierce	Brett Bittle	Mike Critser	Charles E. Keller III, C.E. Keller IV & Brett Bittle (lessees)	1:53 0/0	$600,000
2001	Syrinx Hanover	John Campbell	Chris Marino	Sarah Scott	Need To Know Stables	1:55 1/5	$550,000
2000	Marita's Victory	Berndt O. Lindstedt	Jan Johnson	Marianne Winroth	Robert Waxman	1:54 0/0	$575,000
1999	Oolong	John Campbell	Per Henriksen	Elin Groneg	Scott Jason Stb, P H Stb, Lost Revenue Stb & Rich N Poor Stb	1:54 4/5	$575,000
1998	Fern	Luc Ouellette	Arild Eggen	Bobby Brady	J. Sprow, S. Sjolie, S. Goldband, M. Katz & A. J. Libfeld	1:55 0/0	$550,000
1997	Must Be Victory	Berndt O. Lindstedt	Jan Johnson	Jim Summers	John & Adelaide Skoglund	1:53 2/5	$550,000
1996	Moni Maker	Wally Hennessey	William Andrews	Phil Tuttle	Lindy Racing, Alan B. Foster, E. C., D. B., & T. A. Smith	1:54 1/5	$375,000
1995	Lookout Victory	John F. Patterson, Jr.	Per Eriksson	Line Larsen	Olle Leven	1:55 1/5	$375,000
1994	Gleam	Malvern C. Burroughs	Jimmy Takter	Paivi Huuskonin	Malvern C. Burroughs	1:55 3/5	$375,000
1993	Winky's Goal	Catello Manzi	Charles Sylvester	Kelly Smith	Allavamento la Nuova Sbarra	1:55 2/5	$445,056
1992	Worldly Woman	Bruce Riegle	Gene Riegle	Bob Smalley	T. D. & Linda Van Camp	1:57 0/0	$420,000
1991	Jean Bi	Jan Nordin	Sören Nordin	Pia H. Skjelbreid	Gina Biasuzzi Stable	1:56 0/0	$492,401
1990	Working Gal	Michel Lachance	Ken Seeber	Monica Legge	Wilshire Racing Stable	1:56 0/0	$441,555
1989	Park Avenue Kathy	Bruce Nickells	Bruce Nickells	Brooke Nickells	Park Avenue Stable	1:55 3/5	$423,000
1988	Nan's Catch	Berndt O. Lindstedt	Jan Johnson	Kevin Leny	David & Fredericka Caldwell	1:56 3/5	$395,300
1987	Armbro Fling	George Sholty	George Sholty	Donnie Searl	Armstrong Bros.	1:56 0/0	$338,780
1986	JEF's Spice	Myles McNichol	Jim Gluhm	Greg Diamond	JEF's Standardbred C.C. & North Woodland Stable	1:56 0/0	$397,000
1985	Conch	Hakan Wallner	Jan Johnson	Jim Summers	Michael Egan, Hanley Dawson, Jr. & Edward Rudner	1:56 4/5	$401,000
1984	Fancy Crown	Bill O'Donnell	Ted Andrews	Ted Barnhardt	Fancy Crown Stable	1:55 3/5	$354,000
1983	Tarport Frenzy	Jan Nordin	Sören Nordin	Joe Kroll	Stein Dalseng	1:57 4/5	$313,825
1982	Dance Spell	Howard Beissinger	Howard Beissinger	Bob Roddy	Hanley Dawson, Jr. & Hugh A. Grant, Jr.	1:58 3/5	$256,000
1981	Spring Dash	Berndt O. Lindstedt	Jan Johnson	Jane Kessler	Castleton Farm & Ulf R. Moberg	2:02 1/5	$219,000
1980	Princess Glory	William Popfinger	William Popfinger	Jimmy Woolums	E. A. Powell & S. M. Geoffrion	1:57 4/5	$74,820
1979	Pagan Princess	Peter Haughton	Billy Haughton	Edie Rose	Kosmos Horse Breeders	1:58 3/5	$100,000
1978	Cora T.	Bill Herman	Bill Herman	Charlie Coleman	Don Millar & John Thro	1:57 3/5	$70,000
1977	Elmsford	Henri Filion	Henri Filion	Guy Guilbault	Grades Farm & Henri Filion	1:57 3/5	$65,686
1976	Ima Lula	Joe O'Brien	Joe O'Brien	Kathy Myling	Duncan A. MacDonald	1:56 3/5	$60,474
1975	Keystone Pioneer	Dick DeSantis	Billy Haughton	Bud Pope	Dorothy Haughton & Patricia Bachner	1:59 0/0	$59,567
1974	Berna Hanover	Glen Garnsey	Glen Garnsey	Guy Ryan	Castleton Farm	2:03 3/5	$34,865
1973	Colonial Charm	Glen Garnsey	Glen Garnsey	Richard Marchant	Castleton Farm	2:01 2/5	$32,685
1972	Sara Lane Hanover	Joe O'Brien	Joe O'Brien	Liz Maddox	Armstrong Bros.	2:00 1/5	$32,480
1971	Gay Blossom	Glen Garnsey	Glen Garnsey	Darnaby Fish	Castleton Farm	2:00 0/0	$31,500

1.^{↑} 2020: Raced to full completion amid low attendance due to the COVID-19 pandemic.
