= Saint-Étienne-l'Allier =

- Commune
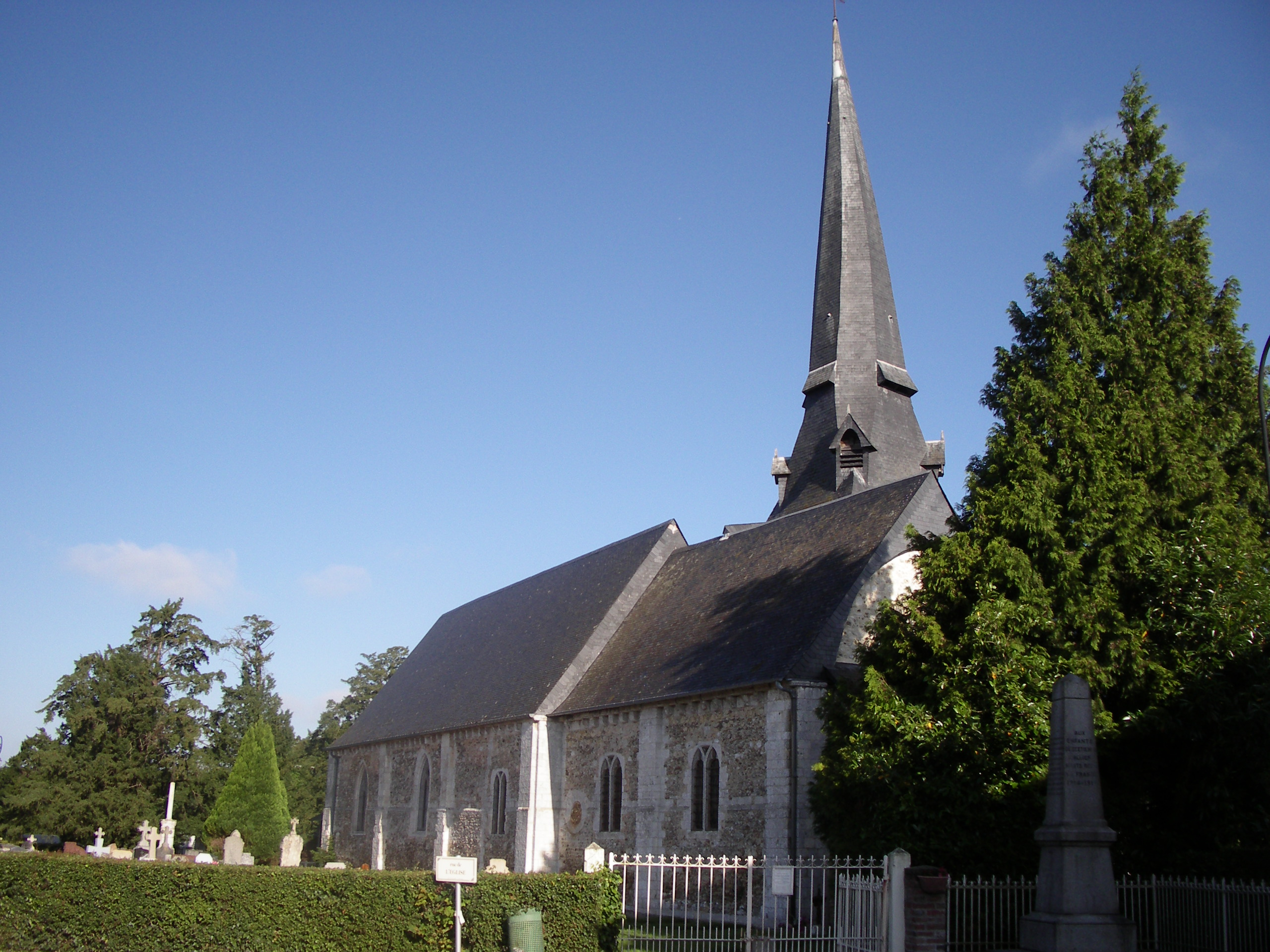
- The church in Saint-Étienne-l'Allier
- Location of Saint-Étienne-l'Allier
- Location within France Location within Normandy
- Coordinates: 49°15′59″N 0°33′14″E
- Country: France
- Region: Normandy
- Department: Eure
- Arrondissement: Bernay
- Canton: Beuzeville

Government
  - Mayor (2020–2026): Jean-Charles Beauché
- Area^{1}: 11.32 km^{2} (4.37 sq mi)
- Elevation: 170 m (560 ft)
- Highest elevation: 166 m (545 ft)
- Lowest elevation: 85 m (279 ft)
- Population (2023): 516
  - Density: 45.6/km^{2} (118/sq mi)
- Time zone: UTC+01:00 (CET)
  - Summer (DST): UTC+02:00 (CEST)
- INSEE/Postal code: 27538 /27450
- ^{1} French Land Register data, which excludes lakes, ponds, glaciers > 1 km^{2} (0.386 sq mi or 247 acres) and river estuaries.

Saint-Étienne-l'Allier (French pronunciation: [sɛ̃.t‿etjɛn lalje]) is a commune in the Eure department in the Normandy region in northern France.

== Geography ==
The commune along with another 69 communes shares part of a 4,747 hectare, Natura 2000 conservation area, called Risle, Guiel, Charentonne.

== Population ==
Historical population
Year	Pop.	±% p.a.
1968	351	—
1975	354	+0.12%
1982	378	+0.94%
1990	436	+1.80%
1999	385	−1.37%
2007	453	+2.05%
2012	550	+3.96%
2017	547	−0.11%
2023	516	−0.97%
Source: INSEE

== See also ==
- Communes of the Eure department
