= Moni Maker =

American Standardbred racehorse

- Breed: Standardbred
- Sire: Speedy Crown
- Grandsire: Speedy Scot
- Dam: Nan's Catch
- Damsire: Bonefish
- Sex: Mare
- Foaled: 1993
- Country: United States
- Colour: Bay
- Breeder: David R. Caldwell, Fredericka Caldwell
- Owner: Moni Maker Stable
- Trainer: William Andrews, Jimmy Takter
- Record: 105: 67-18-10
- Earnings: US$5,589,256

Major wins
- Hambletonian Oaks (1996); Elitloppet (1998); Copenhagen Cup (1998); Breeders Crown (1998); Prix d'Amérique (1999)

Awards
- US Harness Horse of the Year (1998, 1999); US Trotter of the Year (1998, 1999, 2000); US Trotting Mare of the Year (1997, 1998, 1999, 2000)

Honours
- US Harness Racing Hall of Fame (2006)

Moni Maker (February 23, 1993 – May 2, 2014) was an American Standardbred racemare who was one of the most successful trotters in history. After her initial success in her native country she was campaigned internationally, winning major races in France, Sweden, Denmark and Italy. Her biggest wins included the Hambletonian Oaks, Elitloppet, Copenhagen Cup, Breeders Crown and Prix d'Amérique.

Moni Maker retired with 67 wins, 18 seconds and 10 thirds in 105 races earning $5,589,256.

== Background ==
Moni Maker was a bay mare bred in the United States by David and Fredericka Caldwell. She was sired by Speedy Crown out of Nan's Catch by Bonefish.

== Racing career ==
Moni Maker won six of 14 starts earning $72,610 at two. At three she won 19 of her 20 (18 straight) starts and $675,574.

As a four-year-old, Moni Maker won nine of 19 starts and $942,999. She became a millionaire with lifetime earnings of $1,691,183. Her wins included a heat of the Elitlopp, the Classic Oaks and she was the first mare to win the Nat Ray.

At five, Moni Maker earned $1,229,828. Her 12 wins of 17 starts included the Elitlopp (1:53.3 world record), Copenhagen Cup (world record for older mares of 1:56.4 mile rate and race record), Breeders Crown (world record 1:52.3) and Nat Ray.

Her winning ways continued in 1999 with 14 wins in 21 starts, earning $1,494,972. She was the richest trotter of the season and richest Standardbred in the history of harness racing. Moni Maker won the 15/8-mile Prix d'Amerique, the Prix de France (first American trotter to win both), Trotting Classic Series and American-National.

At seven, Moni Maker won seven of 14 starts and $1,173,273. Her career best of 1:52.1 in the Nat Ray put her earnings over $5 million. She recorded the fastest time ever in Europe winning the Grand Criterium de Vitesse in 1:53.2.

Moni Maker ended her racing career in 2000 at The Red Mile trotting a mile in 1:54 under saddle. She shattered the previous world record of 1:58.2.

== Honours and awards ==
Moni Maker was named United States Horse of the Year in 1998 and 1999 and Trotter of the Year in 1998, 1999, and 2000. She was awarded Trotting Mare of the Year four times, 1997-2000 and, when she retired she was the richest Standardbred winning $5,589,256.

She was inducted into the Harness Racing Hall of Fame in July 2006.

== Pedigree ==
Pedigree of Moni Maker
Sire Speedy Crown	Speedy Scot	Speedster	Rodney
Sire Speedy Crown	Speedy Scot	Speedster	Mimi Hanover
Sire Speedy Crown	Speedy Scot	Scotch Love	Victory Song
Sire Speedy Crown	Speedy Scot	Scotch Love	Selka Scot
Sire Speedy Crown	Missile Toe	Florican	Spud Hanover
Sire Speedy Crown	Missile Toe	Florican	Florimel
Sire Speedy Crown	Missile Toe	Worth A Plenty	Darnley
Sire Speedy Crown	Missile Toe	Worth A Plenty	Sparkle Plenty
Dam Nan's Catch	Bonefish	Nevele Pride	Star's Pride
Dam Nan's Catch	Bonefish	Nevele Pride	Thankful
Dam Nan's Catch	Bonefish	Exciting Speed	Speedster
Dam Nan's Catch	Bonefish	Exciting Speed	Expresson
Dam Nan's Catch	Nan Hanover	Speedy Count	Speedster
Dam Nan's Catch	Nan Hanover	Speedy Count	Countess Song
Dam Nan's Catch	Nan Hanover	Noble Nan	Noble Victory
Dam Nan's Catch	Nan Hanover	Noble Nan	Floriclaire
