= Prix d'Amérique =

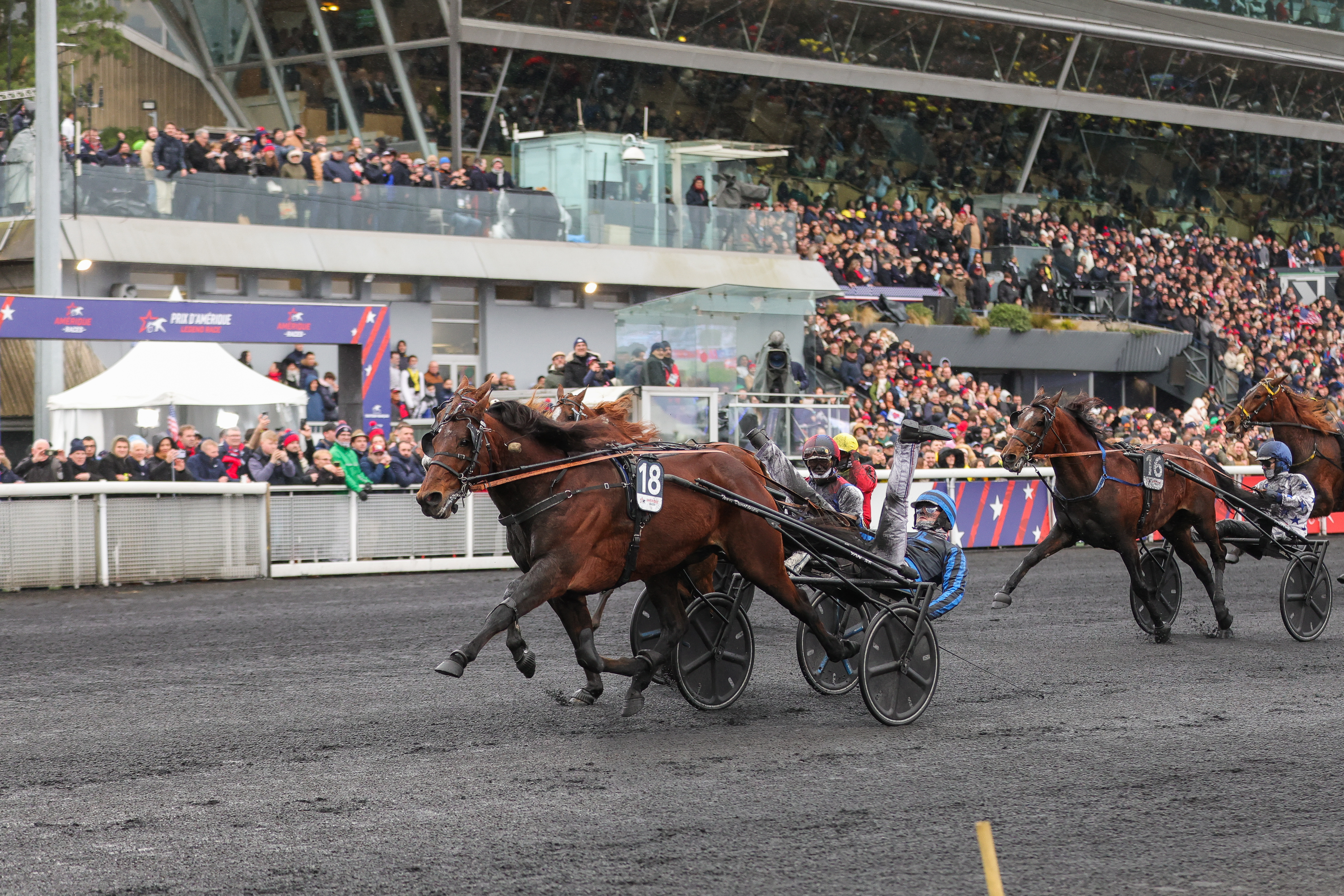
- Prix d'Amérique 2025
- Class: Group One International
- Location: Paris, France
- Inaugurated: 1 February 1920
- Final run: 2025
- Race type: Harness race for standardbred trotters
- Website: https://www.prixdameriqueraces.com/

Race information
- Distance: 2700 meters
- Track: Vincennes
- Purse: EUR 1,000,000

Prix d'Amérique is a harness race held at the Hippodrome de Vincennes in Paris, France. The race takes place on the last Sunday of January every year, and has been doing so since 1920, with the exception for the years 1940-1941 when it was cancelled due to World War II. It was established to thank the US for the help given to France in World War I. It is widely considered the most prestigious harness race in the world.

== Winners ==
Year	Winner	Age	Driver	Trainer	Owner	Time	Country
1920	Pro Patria	5	Th. Monsieur	Jean Cabrol	Jean Cabrol	1:31.40	France
1921	Pro Patria	6	Th. Monsieur	Jean Cabrol	Jean Cabrol	1:28.00	France
1922	Reynolds V	5	M. Gougeon	Hervé Céran-Maillard	Hervé Céran-Maillard	1:29.20	France
1923	Passeport	8	P. Viel	Albert-Victor Bulot	Albert-Victor Bulot	1:26.40	France
1924	Passeport	9	Alexandre Finn	Albert-Victor Bulot	Albert-Victor Bulot	1:26.10	France
1925	Re Mac Gregor	8	C. Dessauze	C. Dessauze	G. Beauvois	1:26.80	France
1926	Uranie	6	Valentino Capovilla	Valentino Capovilla	François Vanackère	1:28.30	France
1927	Uranie	7	Valentino Capovilla	Valentino Capovilla	François Vanackère	1:28.40	France
1928	Uranie	8	Valentino Capovilla	Valentino Capovilla	François Vanackère	1:25.20	France
1929	Templier	10	A. Butti	G. Bourgeois	G. Bourgeois	1:25.40	France
1930	Amazone B	6	Théo Vanlandeghem	Théo Vanlandeghem	Mme Vanlandeghem	1:26.10	France
1931	Hazleton	8	Otto Dieffenbacher	Otto Dieffenbacher	D. Palazzoli	1:27.10	Italy
1932	Hazleton	9	Otto Dieffenbacher	Otto Dieffenbacher	D. Palazzoli	1:27.00	Italy
1933	Amazone B	9	Théo Vanlandeghem	Théo Vanlandeghem	Haras de Douville	1:26.10	France
1934	Walter Dear	8	Charley Mills	Lucien Robert	B. Cassirer	1:26.30	United States
1935	Muscletone	4	Alexandre Finn	Alexandre Finn	A. Riva	1:23.80	Italy
1936	Javari	5	M. Perlbag	A. Gouin	A. Gouin	1:24.80	France
1937	Muscletone	6	Alexandre Finn	Alexandre Finn	G. Maiani	1:23.80	Italy
1938	De Sota	4	Alexandre Finn	Alexandre Finn	Comte O. Mangelli	1:25.50	Italy
1939	De Sota	5	Alexandre Finn	Alexandre Finn	Comte O. Mangelli	1:23.90	Italy
	no race 1940–41
1942	Neulisse	7	C. Domergue	C. Domergue	V. Faurand	1:32.40	France
1943	Nebuleuse V	8	R. Simonard	R. Simonard	R. Laroche	1:25.40	France
1944	Profane	7	A. Sourroubille	A. Délétang	A. Délétang	1:27.30	France
1945	Ovidius Naso	9	Roger Céran-Maillard	Hervé Céran-Maillard	Hervé Céran-Maillard	1:23.70	France
1946	Ovidius Naso	10	Roger Céran-Maillard	Hervé Céran-Maillard	Hervé Céran-Maillard	1:24.30	France
1947	Mistero	7	Romolo Ossani	Romolo Ossani	M. Gutmann	1:24.30	Italy
1948	Mighty Ned	6	V. Antonellini	V. Antonellini	Comte O. Mangelli	1:24.00	Italy
1949	Venutar	6	Ferdinand Réaud	Ferdinand Réaud	Gabriel Gousseau	1:24.60	France
1950	Scotch Fez	7	Sören Nordin	Sören Nordin	J. Engblad	1:22.80	Sweden
1951	Mighty Ned	9	Alexandre Finn	Alexandre Finn	Comte O. Mangelli	1:22.70	Italy
1952	Cancannière	6	Jonel Chryriacos	Jonel Chryriacos	P. Bancilhon	1:23.10	France
1953	Permit	8	Walter Heitmann	Walter Heitmann	Écurie Guthenberg	1:23.20	Germany
1954	Feu Follet X	5	M. Riaud	Alfred Lefèvre	Alfred Lefèvre	1:21.90	France
1955	Fortunato II	6	Roger Céran-Maillard	Charley Mills	J. Gauvreau	1:21.80	France
1956	Gélinotte	6	Charley Mills	Charley Mills	Simone Karle	1:22.00	France
1957	Gélinotte	7	Charley Mills	Charley Mills	Simone Karle	1:22.00	France
1958	Jamin	5	Jean Riaud	Jean Riaud	Camille Olry-Roederer	1:20.00	France
1959	Jamin	6	Jean Riaud	Jean Riaud	Camille Olry-Roederer	1:20.50	France
1960	Hairos II	9	Willem Geersen	Willem Geersen	A. Woordouw	1:21.30	Netherlands
1961	Masina	5	François Brohier	Henri Levesque	Henri Levesque	1:21.70	France
1962	Newstar	5	Walter Baroncini	Walter Baroncini	Écurie Olsa	1:20.30	Italy
1963	Ozo	5	Roger Massue	Roger Massue	Roger Massue	1:20.10	France
1964	Nike Hanover	7	Johannes Frömming	L. Bergami	Écurie Manuela	1:18.90	Italy
1965	Ozo	7	Jan Frömming	Roger Massue	Roger Massue	1:20.50	France
1966	Roquépine	5	Jean-René Gougeon	Henri Levesque	Henri Levesque	1:18.60	France
1967	Roquépine	6	Henri Lévesque	Henri Levesque	Henri Levesque	1:18.60	France
1968	Roquépine	7	Jean-René Gougeon	Henri Levesque	Henri Levesque	1:18.60	France
1969	Upsalin	5	Louis Sauvé	Henri Levesque	Henri Levesque	1:17.60	France
1970	Toscan	7	Michel-Marcel Gougeon	Jean-René Gougeon	Comte de Montesson	1:18.30	France
1971	Tidalium Pélo	8	Jean Mary	Roger Lemarié	Roger Lemarié	1:17.50	France
1972	Tidalium Pélo	9	Jean Mary	Roger Lemarié	Roger Lemarié	1:17.10	France
1973	Dart Hanover	8	Berndt Lindstedt	W. Casoli	Écurie Fläkt	1:17.30	Sweden
1974	Delmonica Hanover	5	Johannes Frömming	Delvin Miller	Delvin Miller	1:18.40	United States
1975	Bellino II	8	Jean-René Gougeon	Maurice Macheret	Maurice Macheret	1:17.80	France
1976	Bellino II	9	Jean-René Gougeon	Maurice Macheret	Maurice Macheret	1:19.10	France
1977	Bellino II	10	Jean-René Gougeon	Maurice Macheret	Maurice Macheret	1:17.90	France
1978	Grandpré	6	Pierre-Désiré Allaire	Pierre-Désiré Allaire	Pierre-Désiré Allaire	1:16.90	France
1979	High Echelon	6	Jean-Pierre Dubois	G-M.Ollitrault	Comte de Senneville	1:18.20	France
1980	Eléazar	10	Léopold Verroken	Léopold Verroken	Alec Weisweiller	1:18.20	France
1981	Idéal du Gazeau	7	Eugène Lefèvre	Eugène Lefèvre	Pierre-Jean Morin	1:17.40	France
1982	Hymour	9	Jean-Pierre Dubois	Jean-Pierre Dubois	Jean-Pierre Dubois	1:16.90	France
1983	Idéal du Gazeau	9	Eugène Lefèvre	Eugène Lefèvre	Pierre-Jean Morin	1:18.70	France
1984	Lurabo	7	Michel-Marcel Gougeon	Jean-Lou Peupion	Maurice Macheret	1:17.00	France
1985	Lutin d'Isigny	8	Jean-Paul André	Maurice Cornière	Maurice Cornière	1:17.80	France
1986	Ourasi	6	Jean-René Gougeon	Jean-René Gougeon	Raoul Ostheimer	1:16.60	France
1987	Ourasi	7	Jean-René Gougeon	Jean-René Gougeon	Raoul Ostheimer	1:16.390	France
1988	Ourasi	8	Jean-René Gougeon	Jean-René Gougeon	Raoul Ostheimer	1:15.70	France
1989	Queila Gédé	7	Roger Baudron	Roger Baudron	Roger Baudron	1:15.50	France
1990	Ourasi	10	Michel-Marcel Gougeon	Jean-René Gougeon	Raoul Ostheimer	1:15.20	France
1991	Ténor de Baune	6	Jean-Baptiste Bossuet	Jean-Baptiste Bossuet	Jean-Baptiste Bossuet	1:15.50	France
1992	Verdict Gédé	5	Jean-Claude Hallais	Jean-Claude Hallais	Mme G Dreux	1:16.60	France
1993	Queen L	7	Stig H. Johansson	Stig H. Johansson	Écurie Ringen	1:15.80	Sweden
1994	Sea Cove	8	Jos Verbeeck	Harald Grendel	Écurie Cicero	1:15.00	Canada
1995	Ina Scot	6	Helen Johansson	Kjell P. Dahlström	Écurie Ina Q AB	1:14.70	Sweden
1996	Cocktail Jet	6	Jean-Étienne Dubois	Jean-Étienne Dubois	Daniel Wildenstein	1:15.50	France
1997	Abo Volo	9	Jos Verbeeck	Paul Viel	Albert Viel	1:14.60	France
1998	Dryade des Bois	7	Jos Verbeeck	Jean-Baptiste Bossuet	Écurie Ténor	1:14.30	France
1999	Moni Maker	6	Jean-Michel Bazire	Jimmy Takter	Écurie Week-End	1:14.30	United States
2000	Général du Pommeau	6	Jules Lepennetier	Jules Lepennetier	Jacky Grisanti	1:12.60	France
2001	Varenne	6	Giampaolo Minnucci	Jori Turja	Scuderia Dany	1:13.70	Italy
2002	Varenne	7	Giampaolo Minnucci	Jori Turja	Scuderia Dany	1:12.90	Italy
2003	Abano As	6	Jos Verbeeck	Erik Bondo	Alwin Schockemöhle	1:15.10	Germany
2004	Kesaco Phedo	6	Jean-Michel Bazire	Jean-Michel Bazire	Écurie Wildenstein	1:12.30	France
2005	Jag de Bellouet	8	Christophe Gallier	Christophe Gallier	Michel Gallier	1:12.60	France
2006	Gigant Neo	8	Dominik Locqueneux	Stefan Melander	Écurie TZ & Lövis	1:12.50	Sweden
2007	Offshore Dream	5	Pierre Levesque	Pierre Levesque	Écurie de Rougemont	1:12.00	France
2008	Offshore Dream	6	Pierre Levesque	Pierre Levesque	Écurie de Rougemont	1:12.10	France
2009	Meaulnes du Corta	9	Franck Nivard	Pierre Levesque	Jean-Pierre Barjon	1:12.50	France
2010	Oyonnax	8	Sebastien Ernault	Vincent Brazon	Manuel Ahres	1:12.40	France
2011	Ready Cash	6	Franck Nivard	Thierry Duvaldestin	Philippe Allaire	1:12.10	France
2012	Ready Cash	7	Franck Nivard	Thierry Duvaldestin	Philippe Allaire	1:12.00	France
2013	Royal Dream	8	Jean-Philippe Dubois	Philippe Moulin	Écurie Victoria Dreams	1:11:90	France
2014	Maharajah	9	Örjan Kihlström	Stefan Hultman	Travkompaniets Stall AB	1:13.30	Sweden
2015	Up And Quick	7	Jean-Michel Bazire	Franck Leblanc	Écurie Quick Star	1:12.20	France
2016	Bold Eagle	5	Franck Nivard	Sébastien Guarato	Pierre Pilarski	1:11.40	France
2017	Bold Eagle	6	Franck Nivard	Sébastien Guarato	Pierre Pilarski	1:11.20	France
2018	Readly Express	6	Björn Goop	Timo Nurmos	Bro Byggnads AB	1:11.20	Sweden
2019	Bélina Josselyn	8	Jean-Michel Bazire	Jean-Michel Bazire	Écurie Yvan Bernard	1:11.70	France
2020	Face Time Bourbon	5	Björn Goop	Sébastien Guarato	Scuderia Bivans	1:11.50	France
2021	Face Time Bourbon	6	Björn Goop	Sébastien Guarato	Scuderia Bivans	1:10.80	France
2022	Davidson du Pont	9	Nicolas Bazire	Nicolas Bazire	Écurie Albert Rayon	1:11.30	France
2023	Hooker Berry	6	Jean-Michel Bazire	Jean-Michel Bazire	Michel Aladenise	1:11.70	France
2024	Idao de Tillard	6	Clément Duvaldestin	Thierry Duvaldestin	Cyril Sevestre	1:11.60	France
2025	Idao De Tillard	7	Clément Duvaldestin	Thierry Duvaldestin	Cyril Sevestre	1:11.10	France

== See also ==
- List of French trotting horse races
- Le Trot
