= Jean-Michel Bazire =

French harness racing driver

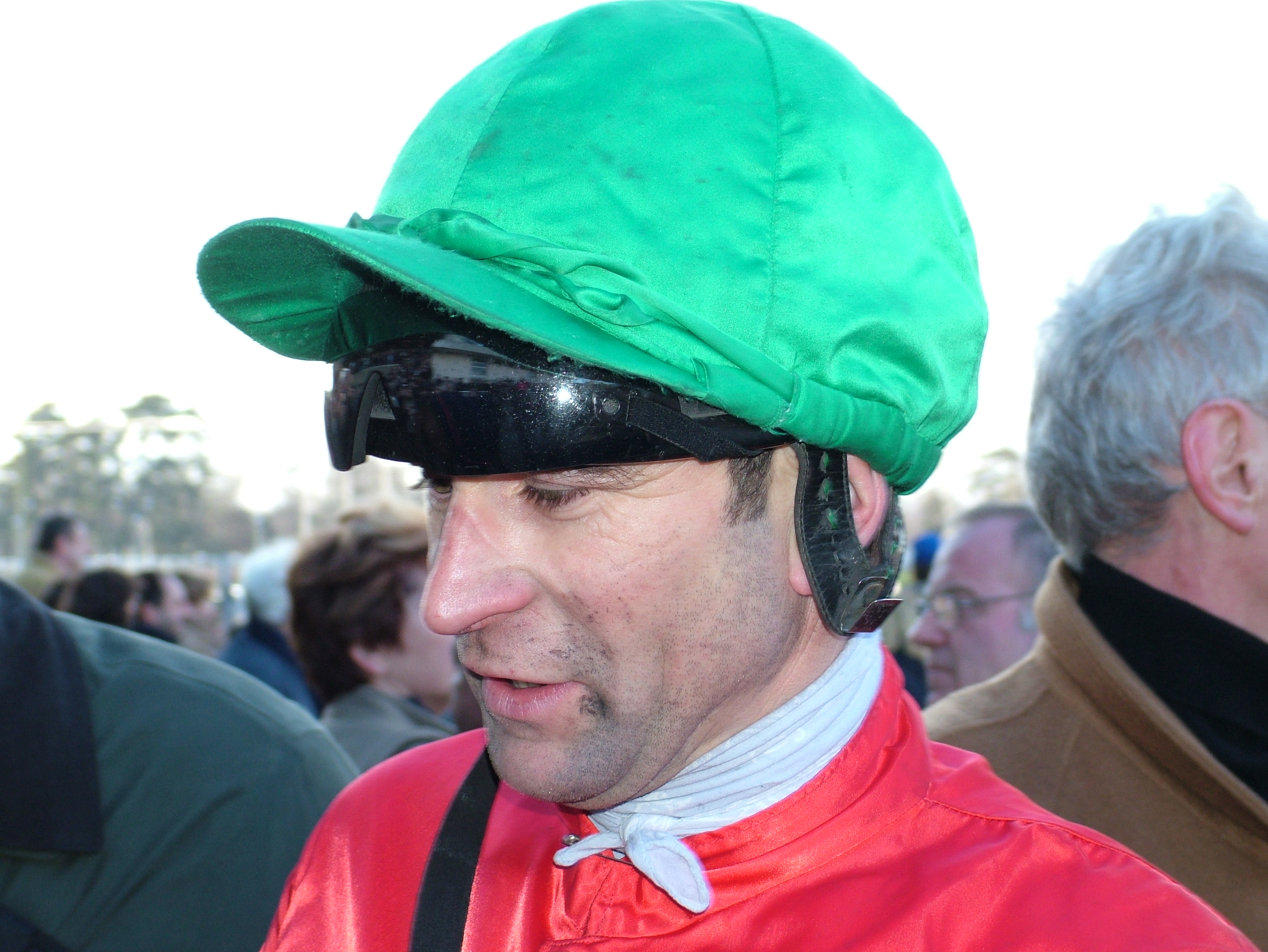
Jean-Michel BAZIRE

Jean-Michel Bazire (born April 16, 1971) is a French harness racing driver. In 1999, he won the Prix d'Amérique driving Moni Maker. In 2004, he was the driver for Kesaco Phedo who also won the Prix. In 2015 he again won it with Up and Quick and with Bélina Josselyn in 2019. In 2023 he won the famous race for the fifth time with Hooker Berry.
