= Sören Nordin =

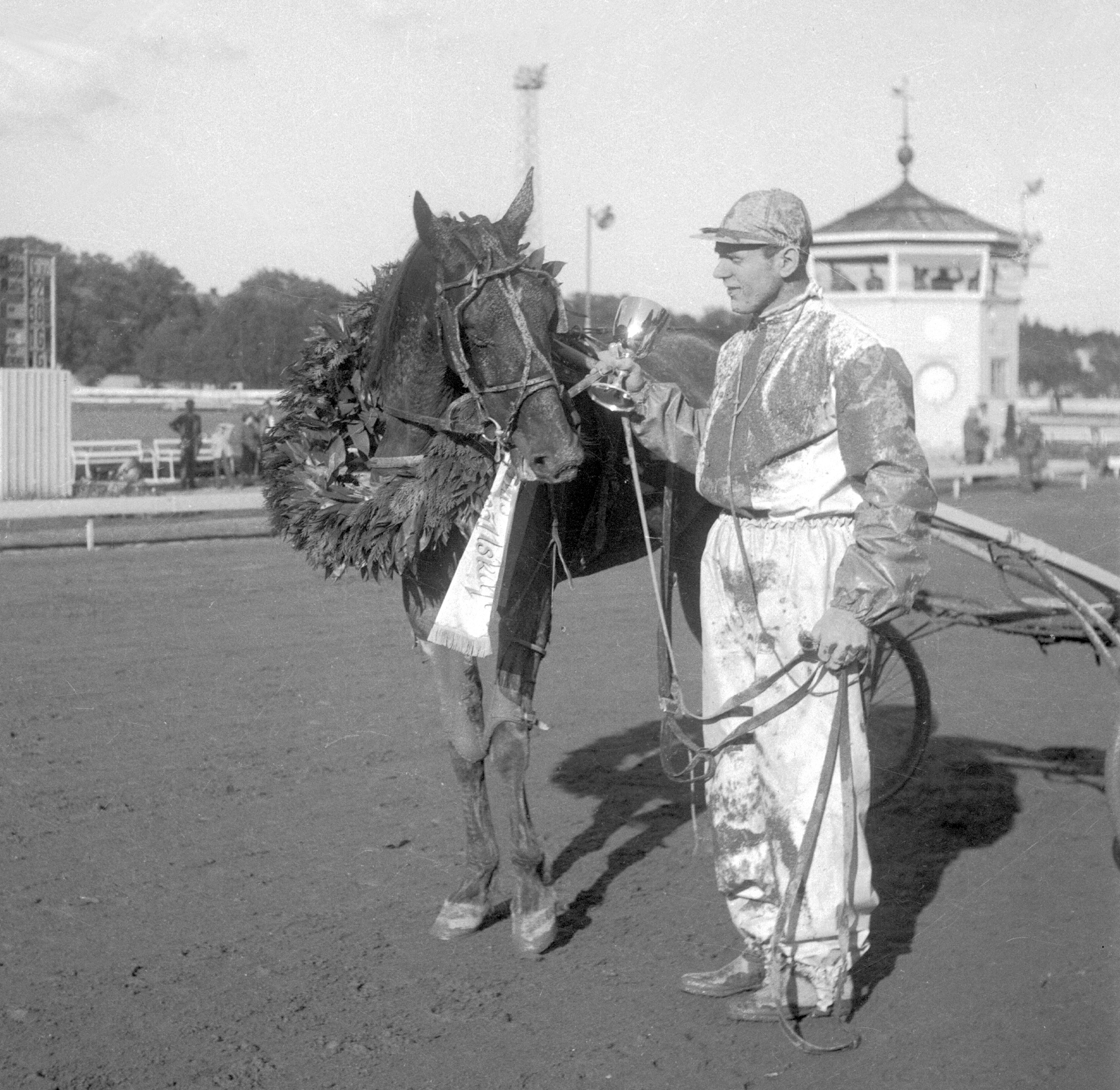
- Sören Nordin with Frances Bulwark after winning Elitloppet in May 1953

Personal information
- Born: 5 September 1917 Forsa, Hälsingland, Sweden
- Died: 6 September 2008 (aged 91)
- Occupations: Harness racing driver and trainer

Horse racing career
- Sport: Horse racing
- Career wins: 3,221

Major racing wins
- Elitloppet (Sweden) (1953); Hambletonian Oaks (United States) (1983, 1991); Breeders Crown (United States) (1984, 1990); World Trotting Derby (United States) (1984); Yonkers Trot (United States) (1984, 1985); Canadian Trotting Classic (Canada) (1985); Dexter Cup (United States) (1985); Peter Haughton Memorial (United States) (1986); Gran Premio Delle Nazioni (Italy) (1952); Gran Premio d'Europa (Italy) (1980); Gran Criterium (Italy) (1992, 1998); Gran Premio Nazionale (Italy) (1993); Italian Trotting Derby (Italy) (1999); Gran Premio Allevatori (Italy) (1998); Gran Premio Continentale (Italy) (2000); Prix d'Amérique (France) (1950); Preis der Besten (Germany) (1956); Oslo Grand Prix (Norway) (1972, 1973); Copenhagen Cup (Denmark) (1976); European 5-year-old Championship (Europe) (2001)

Racing awards
- Dan Patch Trainer of the Year Award (United States) (1986)

Honours
- Hall of Fame (Sweden) (inducted in 2007)

Significant horses
- Mustard, Baltic Speed, Brandy Hanover, Mr Drew, Sandy Bowl, Tarport Frenzy, Ron B Hanover, Nealy Lobell, Frances Bulwark.

Ernst Sören Nordin (5 September 1917, in Forsa, Hälsingland – 6 September 2008) was a Swedish harness racing driver and trainer who later started a stable in America. Nordin won 3,221 races in 10 different countries as a driver, he won the Swedish Trotting Derby 11 times – still a record. In 1950, Nordin won the Prix d'Amérique, and in 1953 the Elitloppet. 21 times, Nordin was the champion driver at Solvalla racetrack in Stockholm, Sweden's premier track.

In 1981, he moved to the United States to set up the Team Nordin stable together with his son, Jan, training their trotters during the winter at Pompano Park's training center. They campaigned several top trotters and world champions including Baltic Speed, Brandy Hanover, Mr Drew, Sandy Bowl, Tarport Frenzy, Ron B Hanover and Nealy Lobell; the horses they trained in the US set 41 world records. In 1992, when their top clients decreased their involvement in trotting, the Nordins moved to Italy to become the private trainers for the Biasuzzi stable. In 1992–1993, the stable was believed the most profitable in the world.
