= Trabrennbahn Bahrenfeld =

Harness racing track in Hamburg, Germany

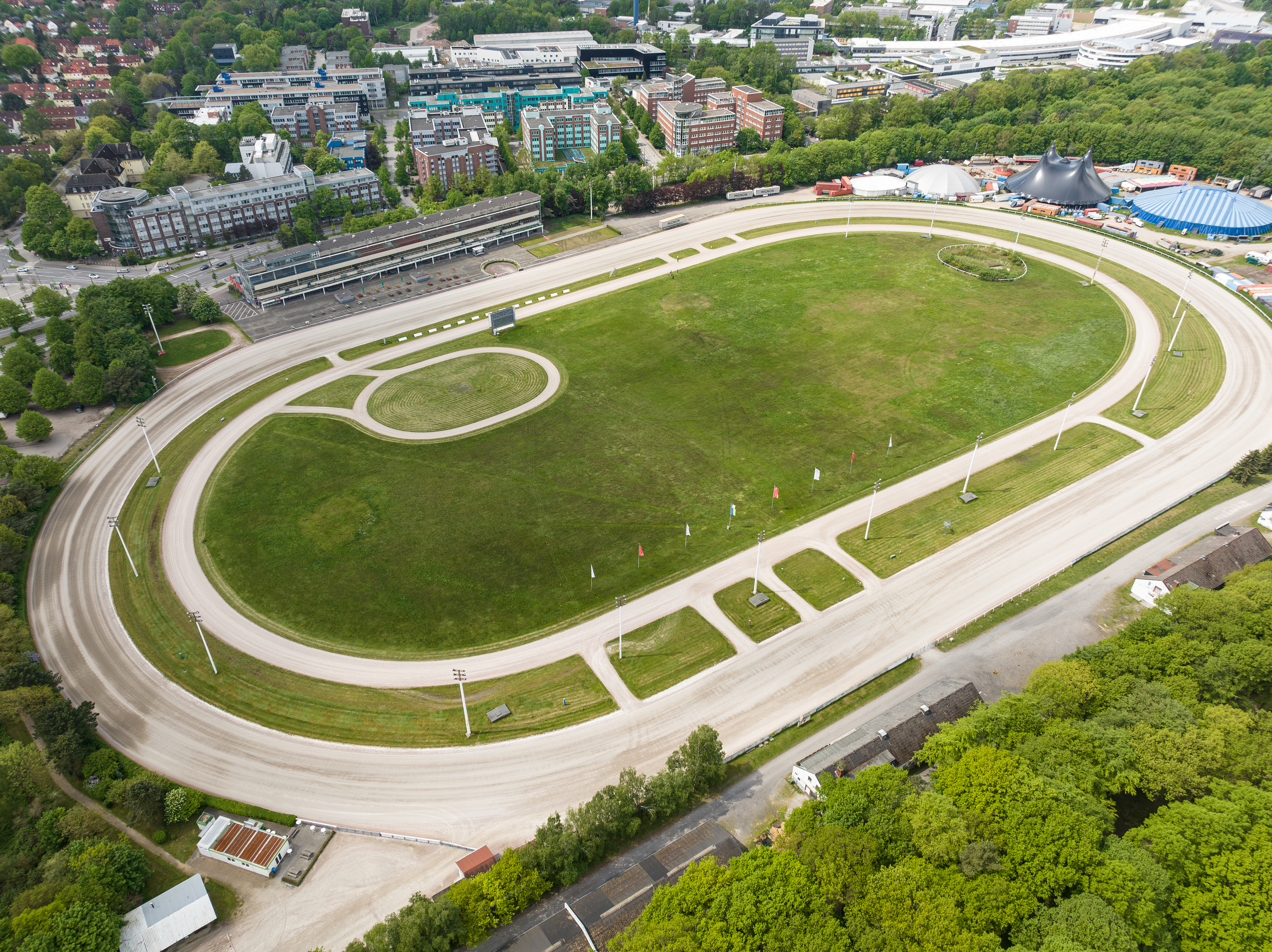
- Interactive map of Trabrennbahn Bahrenfeld
- Location: Hamburg, Germany
- Coordinates: 53.576624°N 9.89203°E
- Capacity: 30,000 for horse racing 90,000 for concerts

Construction
- Opened: 1867

Trabrennbahn Bahrenfeld, located in the Bahrenfeld quarter of Hamburg, Germany, is used for harness racing. It was built in 1867 and renovated in 2011.The track has a capacity of 30,000. Maximum capacity for concerts is 90,000.
