= Jorma Kontio =

Finnish Harness racing driver (born 1953)

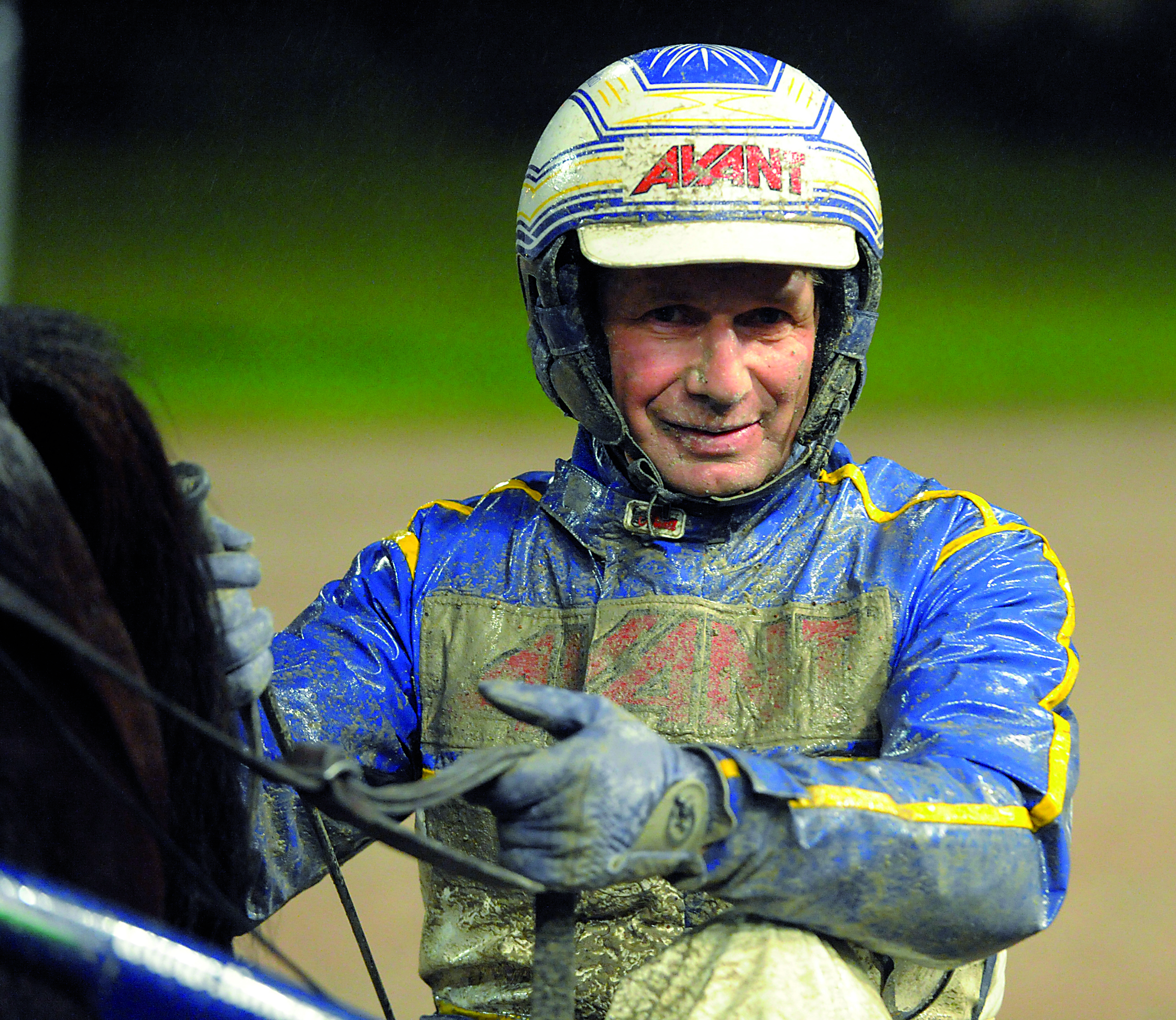
Jorma Kontio in 2012

Erkki Jorma Kontio (born August 7, 1953 in Oulu, Finland) is a Finnish Harness racing driver. With now 12,000 wins, he is the most victorious harness driver in Scandinavia.

Kontio started his career in the late 1960s. Since 2000 he has lived in Sweden. Kontio's daughter Anna-Julia Kontio is a successful Finnish equestrian in Show jumping.

== Major racing wins ==
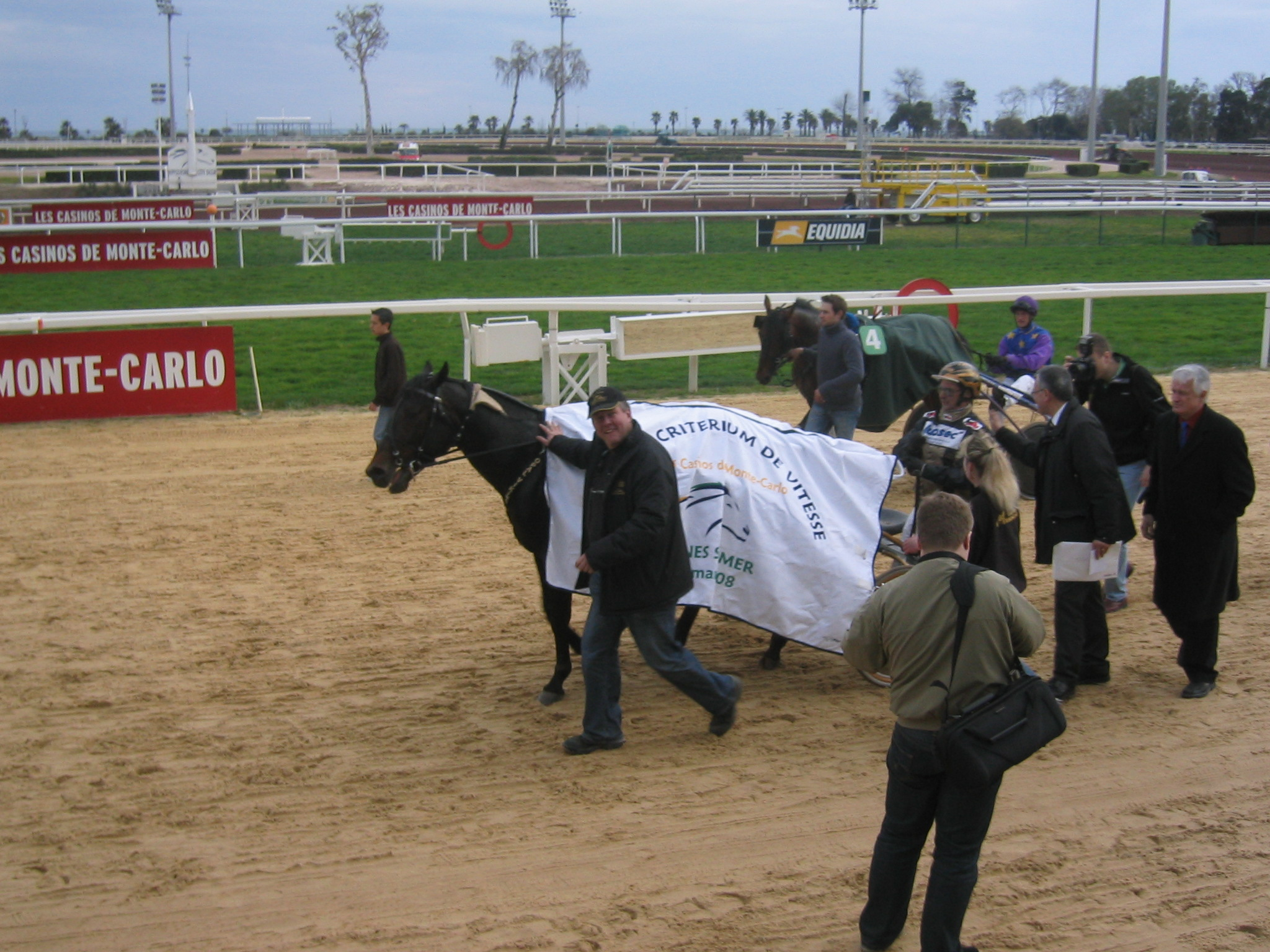
Jorma Kontio and Opal Viking in Nice 2008.

- (Finland) Finnish Trotting Derby: 1993, 1994, 1996, 1997, 1999, 2009, 2011
- (Finland) Finnish Trotting Criterium: 1975, 1992, 1993, 2008, 2010
- (Finland) The Finlandia Race: 1985, 1986, 2007
- (Finland) Kuninkuusravit: 2015
- (Sweden) Swedish Trotting Derby: 2008, 2016
- (Sweden) Swedish Trotting Criterium: 2009, 2012, 2015, 2017
- (Sweden) Hugo Åbergs Memorial: 1995
- (Sweden) Åby Stora Pris: 1993, 2001, 2013
- (Europe) European Trotting Derby: 1992, 2016
- (Europe) 3-year-old European Championship: 2014
- (Europe) 5-year-old European Championship: 1994, 2017
- (France) Grand critérium de vitesse de la Côte d'Azur: 1995, 2008
- (France) Grand Prix du Sud-Ouest: 1996, 2000
- (France) Critérium Continental: 2004
- (Italy) Gran Premio Tino Triossi: 2001, 2005
- (Italy) Gran Premio Orsi Mangelli: 2003
- (Italy) Gran Premio delle Nazioni: 2008, 2009
- (Italy) Premio Costa Azurra: 1995, 1999
- (Netherlands) Grote Prijs der Giganten: 1985, 1986, 1993
- (Austria) Graf Kalman Hunyady Memorial: 1998, 2000
- (Denmark) Copenhagen Cup: 1992
- (Germany) Grosser Preis von Bild Hamburg: 1986, 1995

== Sources ==
- Jorma Kontio's homepage (in Swedish and Finnish)
