= Culture of Finland =

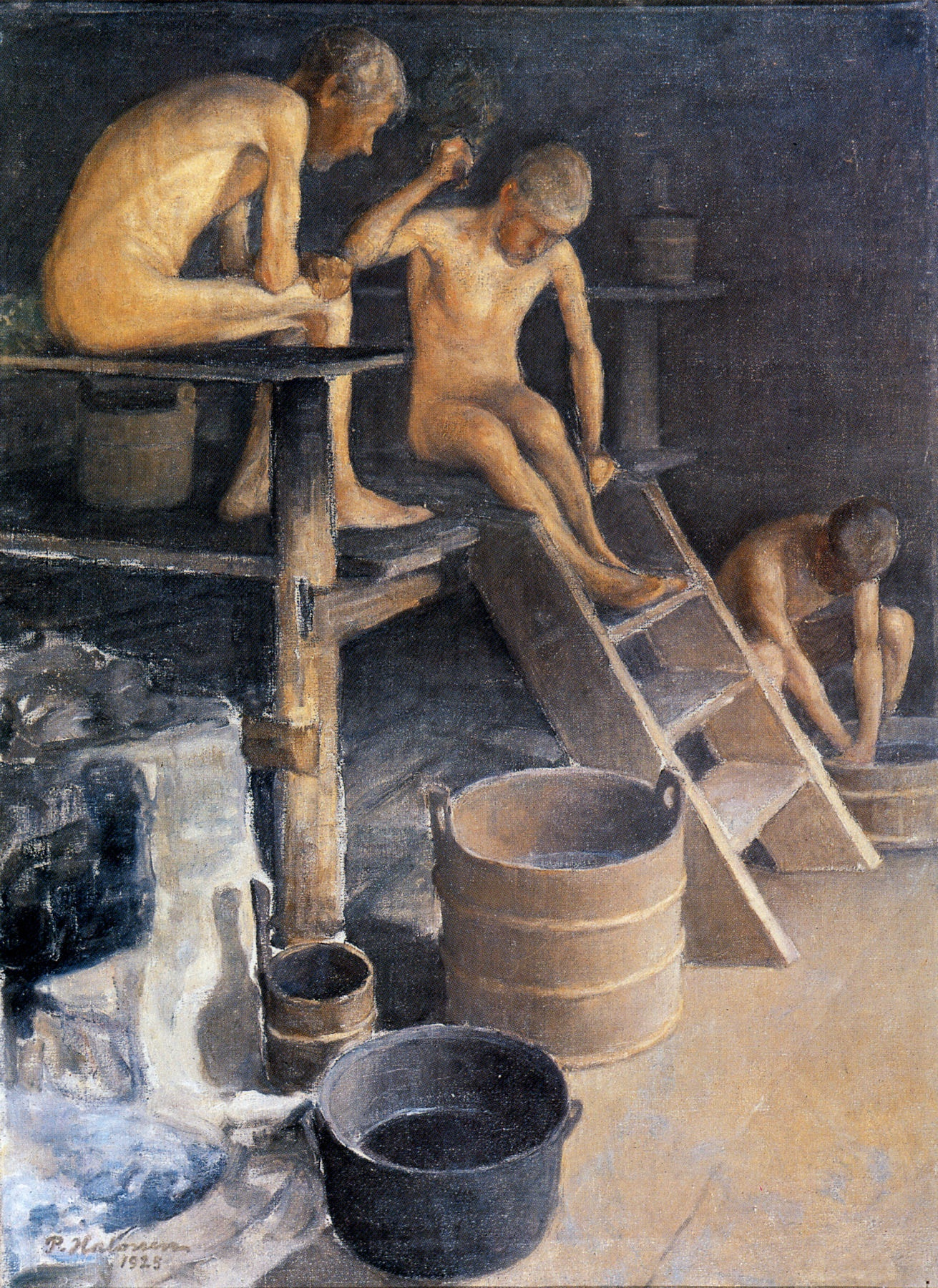
In the sauna, by Pekka Halonen, 1925

The culture of Finland combines indigenous heritage, as represented for example by the country's national languages Finnish (a Uralic language) and Swedish (a Germanic language), and the sauna, with common Nordic and European cultural aspects. Because of its history and geographic location, Finland has been influenced by the adjacent areas, various Finnic and Baltic peoples as well as the former dominant powers of Sweden and Russia. Finnish culture is built upon the relatively ascetic environmental realities, traditional livelihoods, and heritage of egalitarianism (e.g. everyman's right, universal suffrage) and the traditionally widespread ideal of self-sufficiency (e.g. predominantly rural lifestyles and modern summer cottages).

There are cultural differences among the various regions of Finland, especially minor differences in dialect. Minorities, some of which have a status recognised by the state, such as the Sami, Swedish-speaking Finns, Karelians, Romani, Jews, and Tatars, maintain their cultural identities within Finland. Many Finns are emotionally connected to the countryside and nature, as large-scale urbanisation is a relatively recent phenomenon.

== Historical overview ==
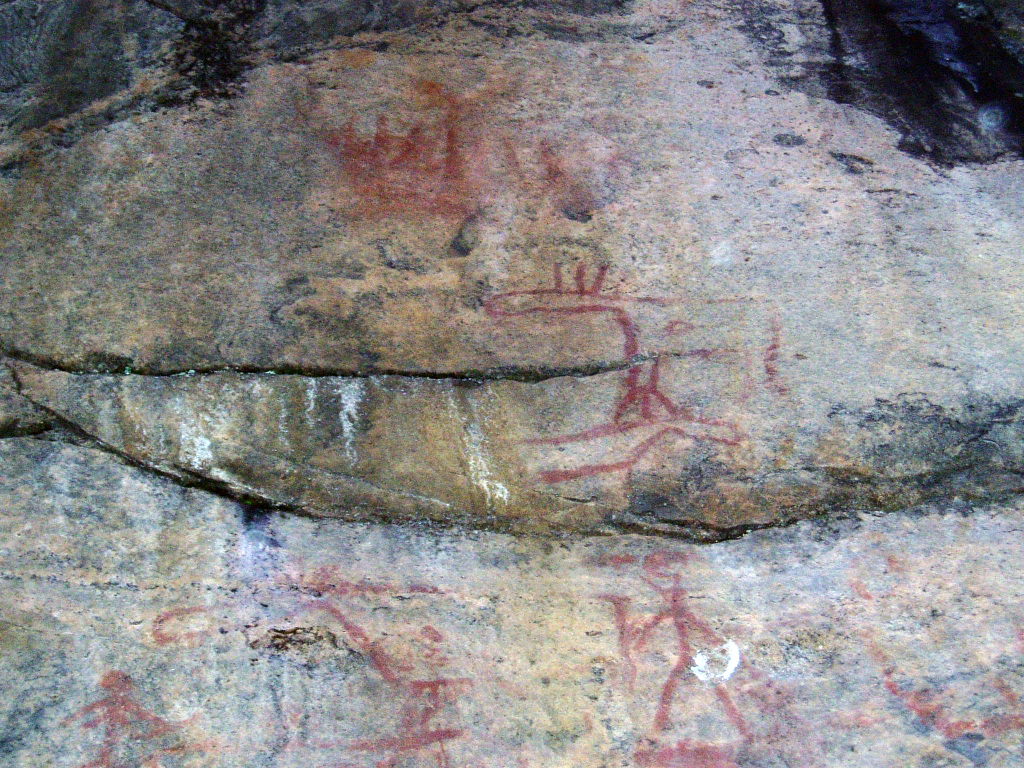
Prehistoric red ochre painted rock art of moose, human figures, and boats in Astuvansalmi, Finland, from ca. 3800–2200 BC

The Scandinavian ice sheet covered most of northern Europe. Following its recession around 8000 BC, people began arriving in what is today Finland, with a majority presumably traveling from the south and east. Recent archaeological finds also reveal the presence of the north-western Komsa culture in northern Finland to be as old as the earliest discoveries on the Norwegian coast.

What is today Finland belonged to the northeastern Kunda culture until around 5000 BC and the Comb Ceramic culture from about 4200–2000 BC. The Kiukainen culture appeared on the southwestern coast of Finland around 1200 BC.

From 1100 to 1200, the crown of Sweden started to incorporate Finland. However, Novgorod also attempted to gain control. Several wars occurred between 1400 and 1700 where Finland fought against Sweden, Novgorod, the Grand Duchy of Moscow, and imperial Russia. In 1721, the Nystad Peace Treaty was signed, ending Swedish dominance in the Baltic region. In 1809, Finland was annexed by Russia. However from 1809 to 1917, Finland became an autonomous Grand Duchy with the Russian Czar as the constitutional monarch. In southeastern Finland, the region of Karelia, where most of the Russo-Swedish conflicts occurred, was influenced by both cultures while remaining peripheral to both epicentres of power. The verses in Finland's national epic, the Kalevala, originate mainly from Karelia and Ingria.

The 19th century brought a feeling of national Romanticism and Nationalism throughout Europe. Finland's nationalism also grew, forming cultural identity and making control of the land a priority. An expression of Finnish identity by the University docent, A. I. Arwidsson (1791–1858), became an often quoted Fennoman credo: "Swedes we are not, Russians we do not want to become, let us, therefore, be Finns." (Note: Swedish form: "Svenskar äro vi icke längre, ryssar vilja vi icke bli, låt oss alltså bli finnar." Finnish form: "Ruotsalaisia emme ole, venäläisiksi emme tule, olkaamme siis suomalaisia".) Nationalism heightened and resulted in a declaration of full independence from Russia on 6 December 1917, Finnish Independence Day. Notably, nationalists did not consider the Swedish-speakers members of a different (Swedish) nation; in fact, many Fennomans came from Swedish-speaking families.

== Ethnic groups and languages ==
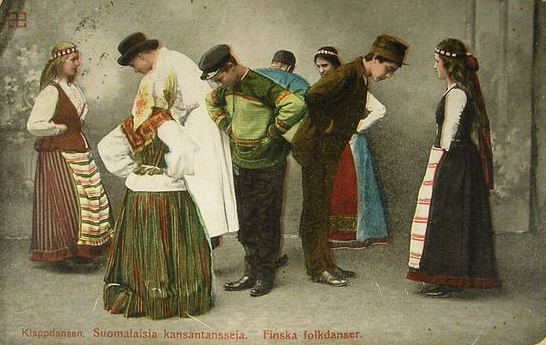
Finnish folk dancers in a 1907 postcard sent from Mustamäki, Finland

=== Finns ===
The majority ethnic group of Finland is the Finns. Most Finns speak Finnish as their mother tongue. The Finnish language is not an Indo-European language. It belongs to the Uralic language family. Finns are traditionally divided into subgroups (heimo) based on their dialect, but these groupings have only minor importance due to 20th-century urbanization and internal migration.

==== Swedish-speaking Finns ====
The largest subculture in Finland is its Swedish-speaking Finns. The political party Swedish People's Party (Svenska Folkpartiet), has traditionally had a small but important part of the Swedish-Finnish culture. The daily newspaper Hufvudstadsbladet ('Capital City Paper') is the largest Swedish daily newspaper in Finland and has its headquarters in Helsinki. The Swedish-speaking minority has been the target of harassment and discrimination in Finland. They are still considered the upper-class in Finland, especially in Helsinki, and have earned nicknames, such as "Svenska talande bättre folk" ('Swedish speaking better people'). Swedish-Finns are also sometimes referred to as "Ankkalampi" (Ankdammen or 'The Duck Pond') due to their relatively small number where everybody knows each other. Today, however, most differences are blurred (though rich, powerful Swedish-speaking families still exist) due to mixed marriages and inter-cultural homogenization and communication. The Swedish-Finnish group does have unique traditions distinct from the mainstream Finnish-speaking ones but does not live in a different society. The group has various origins, both from language switching and from immigration.

=== Sami ===
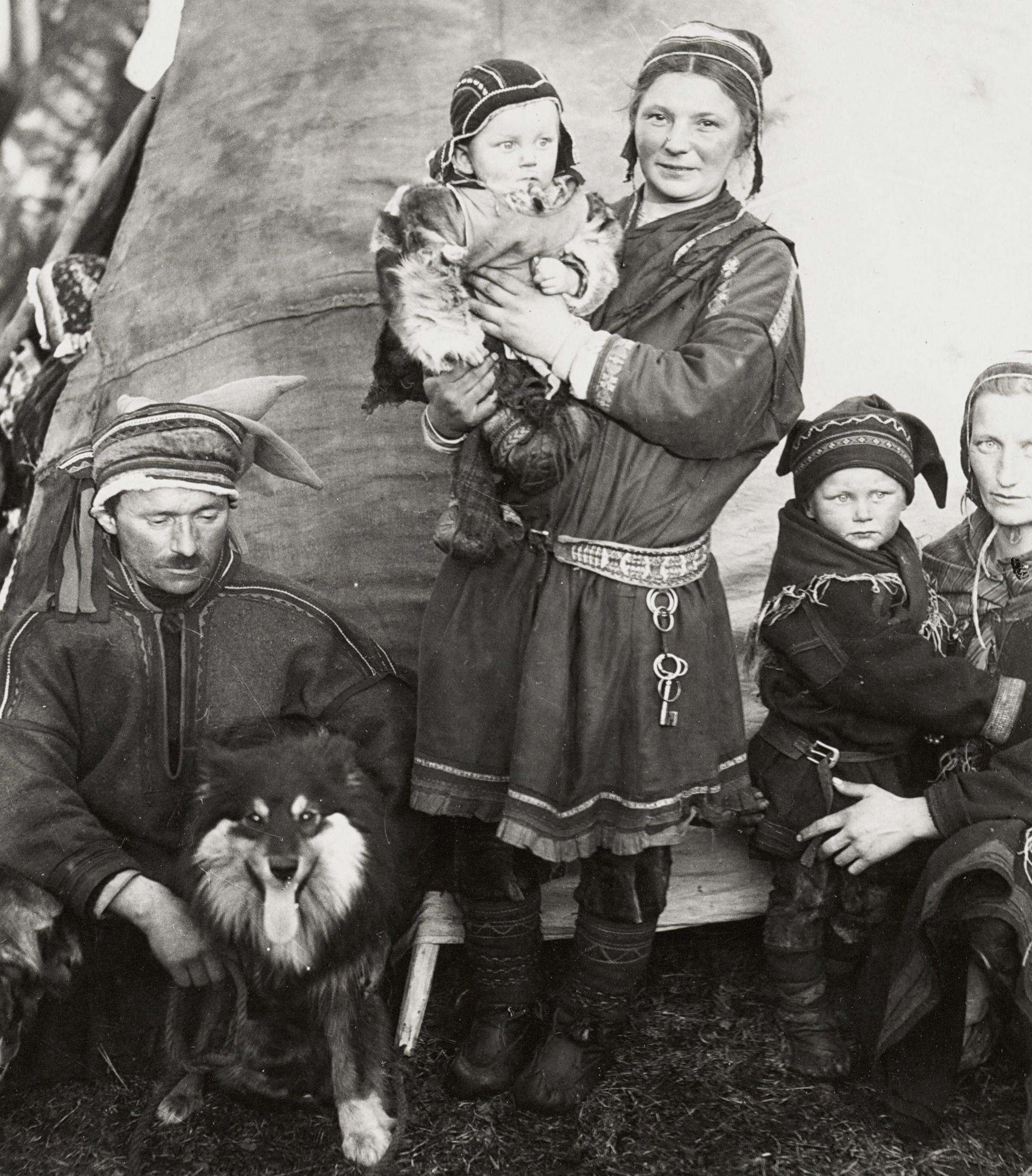
Sámi family in traditional costumes from Finland.

The Lapland region of the North holds the Sami population. Up to around 1500, the Sami were mainly fishermen and trappers, usually in a combination, leading a nomadic lifestyle decided by the migrations of the reindeer. Traditionally, Sami people engaged in fishing, trapping and herding reindeer. They have traditionally organized their societies differently from the Finns due to their nomadic lifestyle. Their native language is not Finnish, but one of the three Sami languages spoken in Finland: Northern Sámi, Inari Sámi or Skolt Sámi. However, modern times have brought most Sami to urban areas, where they assimilate to mainstream society and speak Finnish. 10% of Sami continue herding in Northern Finland. Currently, the Sami are a 5% minority in their native Finnish Lapland.

=== Romani ===
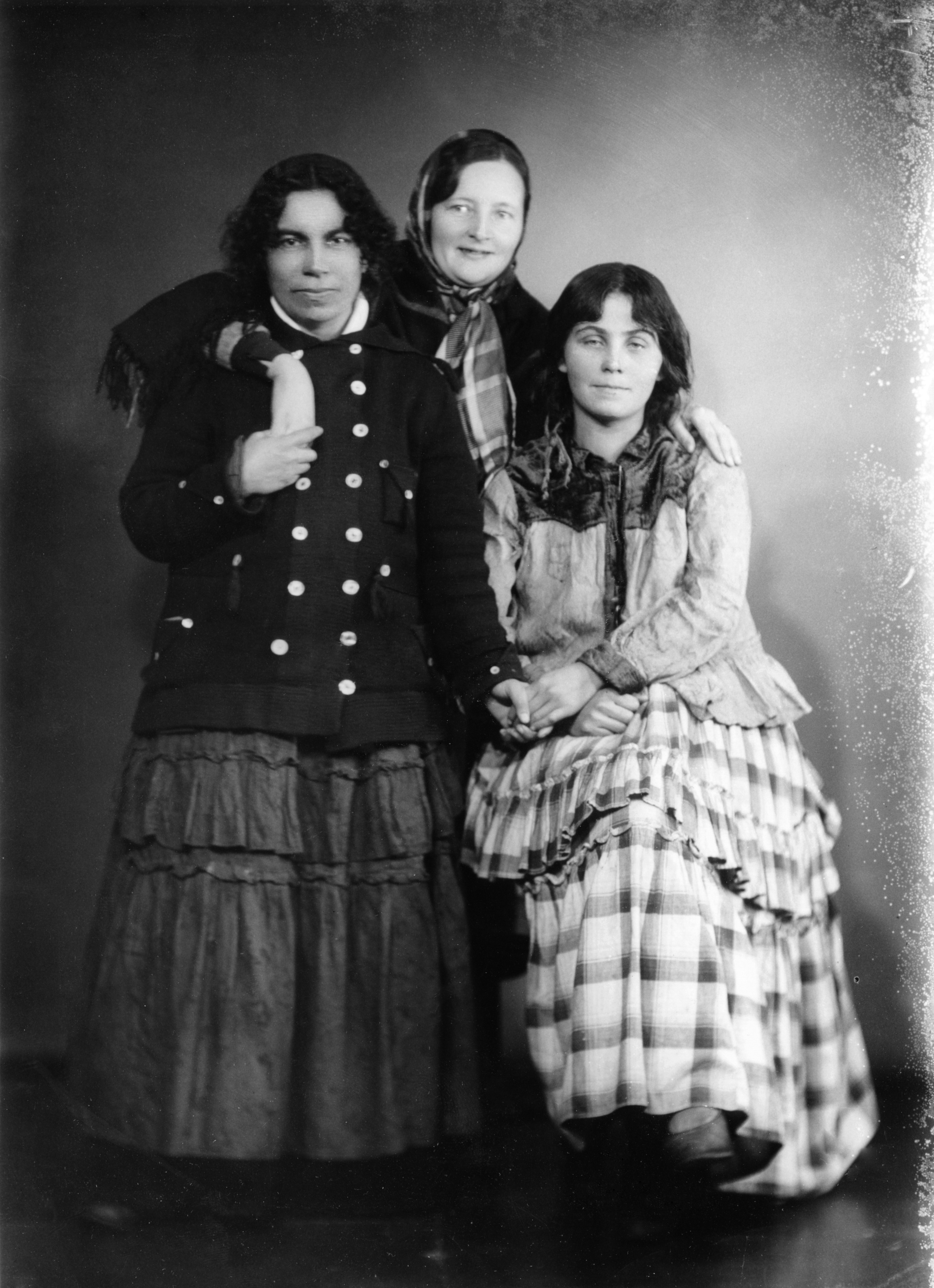
Three Finnish Romani women in Helsinki, Finland, in 1930s

Another nomadic group is the Finnish Roma who have existed since the 17th century. For centuries Roma men were horse traders, whereas in the post-war era they have turned to horse breeding and dealing in automobiles and scrap metal. Women traditionally engage in fortune-telling and handcrafts. Roma have been the target of harassment and discrimination in Finland. "A permanent Advisory Commission on Gypsy Affairs was set up in 1968, and in 1970 racial discrimination was outlawed through an addition to the penal code. The law punished blatant acts such as barring Gypsies from restaurants or shops or subjecting them to unusual surveillance by shopkeepers or the police." Today, financial aid is provided to improve the standard of living for 5,000–6,000 Finnish Roma.

== Social beliefs ==
=== Gender equality ===
After examining the position of women around the world, the Washington-based Population Crisis Committee reported in 1988 that Finland, slightly behind top-ranked Sweden and just ahead of the United States, was one of the very best places in which a woman could live. The group reached this conclusion after examining the health, educational, economic, and legal conditions that affect women's lives.

When compared with women of other nations, Finnish women, who accounted for just over 50 percent of the population in the mid-1980s, did have a privileged place. They were the first in Europe to gain the franchise, and by the 1980s they routinely constituted about one-third of the membership of the Eduskunta (parliament) and held several ministerial posts. In the 1980s, about 75 percent of adult women worked outside the home; they made up about 48 percent of the workforce. Finnish women were as well educated as their male counterparts, and, in some cases, the number of women studying at the university level, for example, was slightly ahead of the number of men. In addition to an expanding welfare system, which since World War II had come to provide them with substantial assistance in the area of childbearing and child-rearing, women had made notable legislative gains that brought them closer to full equality with men.

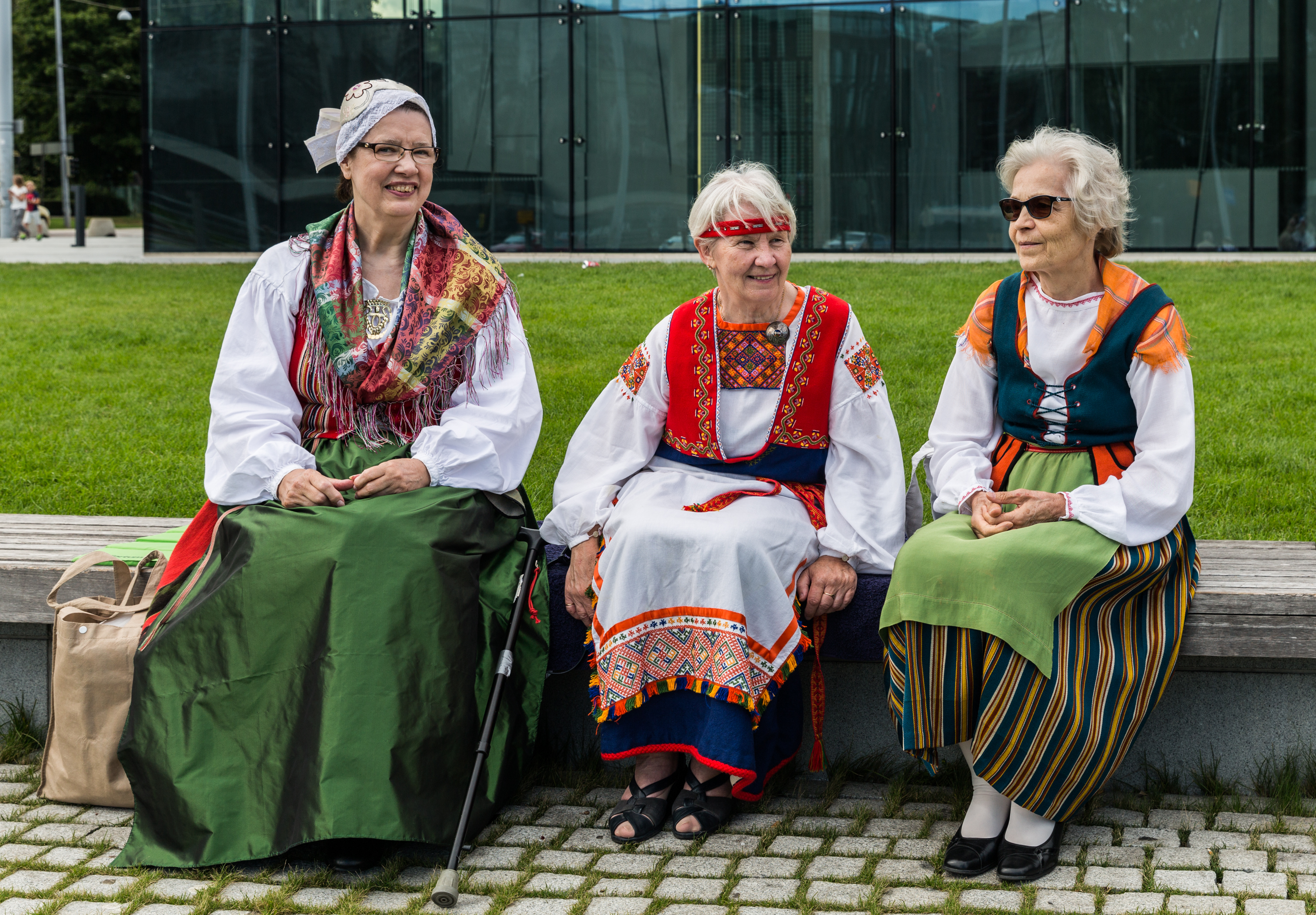
Women dressed in Finnish folk costumes

In 1972 the Council for Equality was established to advise lawmakers on methods for realizing full legal equality for women. In 1983 legislation arranged that both parents were to have equal rights for custody of their children. A year later, women were granted equal rights in the establishment of their children's nationality. Henceforth any child born of a Finnish woman would have Finnish citizenship. After a very heated national debate, legislation was passed in 1985 that gave women an equal right to decide what surname or surnames they and their children would use. These advances were capped by The Act on Equality between Women and Men that went into effect in early 1987 forbidding any discrimination based on sex and protecting against this discrimination. Once these laws were passed, Finnish authorities signed the United Nations Convention on the Elimination of All Forms of Discrimination Against Women (CEDAW) in 1986.

In several areas, however, the country's small feminist movement maintained that the circumstances in which Finnish women lived needed to be improved. Most striking was the disparity in wages. Although women made up just under half the workforce and had a tradition of working outside the home, they earned only about two-thirds of the wages paid to men. Occupations in which women predominated, such as those of retail and office personnel, were poorly paid in contrast to those in which men constituted the majority. Despite the sexes' equal educational attainments, and despite a society where sexual differentiation played a smaller role than it did in many other countries, occupational segregation in Finland was marked. In a few of the twenty most common occupations were the two sexes equally represented. Only in occupations relating to agriculture, forestry, and school teaching was a rough parity approached, and as few as 6 percent of Finns worked in jobs where 40 to 60 percent of workers were of the opposite sex. Studies also found that equal educational levels did not—in any category of training—prevent women's wages from lagging behind those paid to men. Women tended to occupy lower positions, while males were more often supervisors or managers. This was the case everywhere, whether in schools or universities, in business, in the civil service, or politics at both the local level and the national level.

In addition to occupying a secondary position in the workplace, women had longer workdays because they performed a greater share of household tasks than did men. On the average, their workweek outside the home was several hours shorter than men's because a greater number of them were employed only part-time or worked in the service sector, where hours were shorter than they were in manufacturing. Studies have found, however, that women spent about twice as much time on housework as men—about three hours and forty minutes a day, compared with one hour and fifty minutes for men. Men did twice as many household repairs and about an equal amount of shopping, but they devoted only one-third to one-fourth as much time to cleaning, cooking, and caring for children. Given that the bulk of family chores fell to women, and that they were five times more likely than men to head a single-parent family, the shortcomings of Finland's child day-care system affected women more than it did men. The Equality Law that went into effect in 1987 committed the country to achieve full equality for women. In the late 1980s, there was a timetable listing specific goals to be achieved during the remainder of the 20th century. The emphasis was equality for everyone, rather than protection for women. Efforts were undertaken not only to place women in occupations dominated by males but also to bring males into fields traditionally believed to belong to the women's sphere, such as child care and elementary school teaching. Another aim was for women to occupy a more equal share of decision-making positions.

Since the 1986 Equality Act, a number of updates have been made. The most recent, the Non-Discrimination Act passed in 2015, prohibited discrimination based on gender identity or gender expression and a gender equality plan requirement was extended to comprehensive schools and employers. It also made pay surveys more precise, a National Non-Discrimination and Equality Tribunal was established, and the independent position of the Ombudsman for Equality was strengthened. It has been clarified that in the Equality Act, the phrase 'gender identity' refers to an individual's experience of their own gender, through clothing, behaviour, or by other means.

=== Family structure ===
The Finnish family life is usually understood to be centered on the nuclear family, rather than the extended family. There are usually one or two children in a family. Traditionally, men were the wage-earners and women remained in the home and cared for children. However, since the Second World War, gender roles have changed. Today, both men and women are dual wage-earners. The welfare system allows for generous parental leave with income-based benefits. Finnish parents have the option to take partial or total leave they are entitled to. A majority of mothers opt to take longer leave, up to one year. Finland's divorce rate is 51% of marriages being dissolved (Statistics Finland, updated 5/07). Cohabitation is also common. Finland has the highest proportion of quarter lifers, (those in their twenties) who have left the nest (i.e. no longer live with parents) in Europe.

=== Etiquette ===
Finnish people are stereotyped as being very introverted, having little interest in small talk, and being very protective of their personal space. This was the subject of a 2005 book Finland: Cultural Lone Wolf by Richard Lewis. In October 2018, the BBC published an article on this subject.

=== Economic equality ===
The Finnish society encourages equality and liberalism with a popular commitment to the ideals of the welfare state; discouraging disparity of wealth and division into social classes. Everyman's right (Ministry of Environment, 1999) is a philosophy carried over from ancient times. All citizens have access to public and private lands for agrarian activities or leisure. Finns value being close to nature; the agricultural roots are embedded in the rural lifestyle. Finns are also nationalistic, as opposed to self-identification with ethnicity or clan.

With the emergence of reform, the Compulsory Education Act made education a civil right and available to all citizens, except for tertiary education, which is free of charge, and admissions are based strictly on test scores. The beliefs of the Finns are future employment security necessitating higher education in today's increasingly technological world.

== Religion ==
Prior to the Christianization of Finland in the 11th century, Finnish paganism was the primary religion. Song magic and bear worship were distinctive marks of the ancient religion. A contemporary revival of the belief system exists, called suomenusko.

Christianity entered Finnish culture in the 12th century. As in 2016, 72.8% of Finns belong to the Evangelical Lutheran Church and 1.1% belong to the Finnish Orthodox Church.

== Holidays and festivals ==
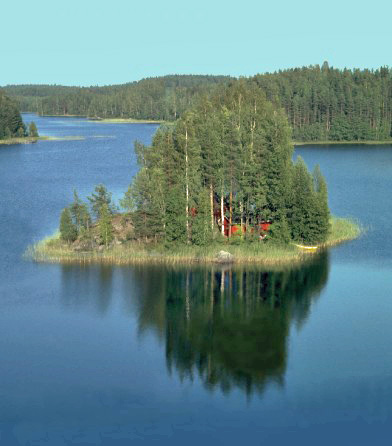
A summer cottage (mökki) on a lake island

Finnish holidays are similar to the Western Christian calendar and Protestant traditions. Holidays and traditions are a blend of the thousand year old Christian presence and vestiges of old Finnish pagan traditions.

Notable among these is Juhannus, the Finnish Midsummer. A majority of Finns retreat to summer cottages (mökki) on any one of Finland's numerous lakes. Depending on the region, a bonfire at midnight celebrates the summer solstice, and in Åland, the Swedish-originated tradition of dancing around the Maypole is observed. The midsummer traditions also include different versions of pairing magic and folklore in the festivities. Midsummer Day is also Flag Day in Finland.

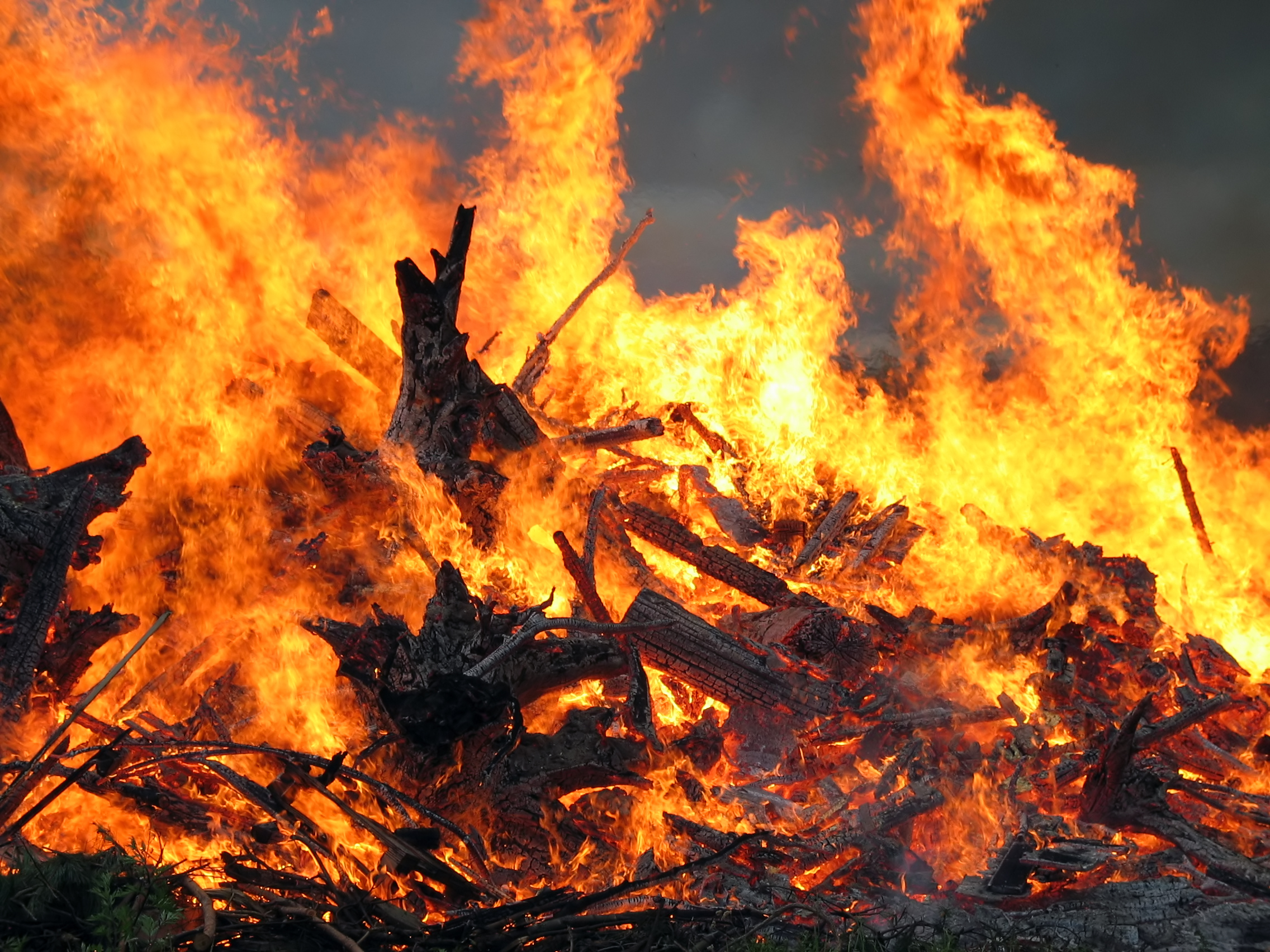
Midsummer bonfire (kokko) in Mäntsälä

The Finnish Christmas, Joulu, follows traditions of Christmas trees and the Advent calendars. Holidays start on 23 December. Gift giving occurs on Christmas Eve with a visit from Joulupukki (Father Christmas, Santa Claus). Traditional meals are typically only eaten on Christmas followed by sauna. Christmas Day is reserved for a "quiet day" and the holidays end after the 26th, St. Stephen's Day (tapaninpäivä).

Easter is a combination of Christian and Pagan customs. Either on Palm Sunday or the Holy Saturday, children dress up as witches (noita) and go from door to door, giving away daffodil adorned branches of willow in exchange for sweets. This is similar to the celebration of Halloween in some countries (such as the United Kingdom and the United States). Burning Easter bonfires is a Pagan custom meant to keep witches at bay.

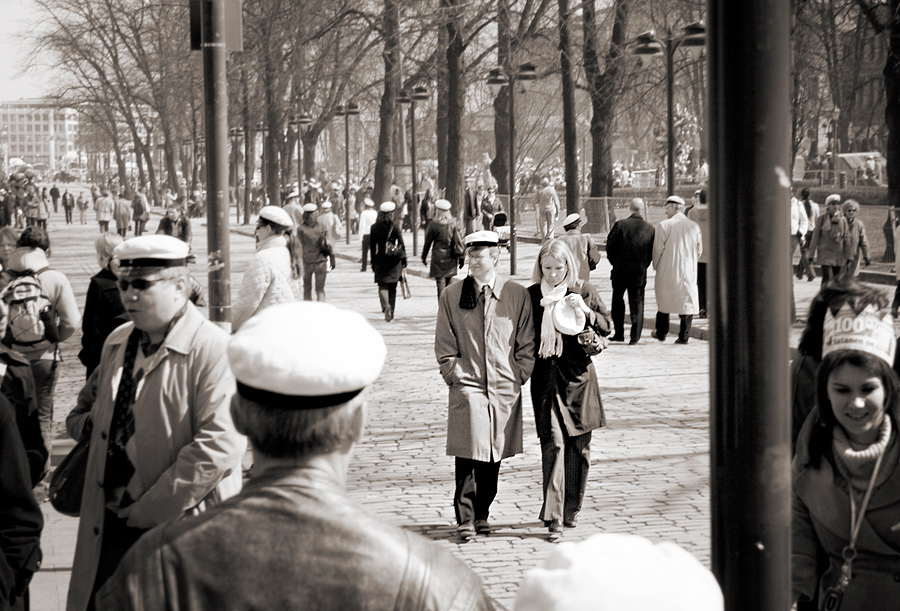
Students on Helsinki's Esplanadi wearing their caps on Vappu

Vappu, or May Day is a national holiday, an event for Finns to emphatically welcome spring after several months of little daylight. It can be compared to Mardi Gras with parades and parties. Traditionally, the event begins on the eve of Vappu by former and current students putting on their student caps (graduation cap).

Finnish Independence Day is 6 December and a national holiday.

=== Public holidays ===
All official holidays in Finland are established by acts of Parliament. The official holidays can be divided into Christian and secular holidays. The main Christian holidays are Christmas, Epiphany, Easter, Ascension Day, Pentecost, and All Saints' Day. The secular holidays are New Year's Day, May Day, Midsummer Day, and the Independence Day. Christmas is the most extensively celebrated holiday: usually at least 24 to 26 December are holidays.

== Sauna ==
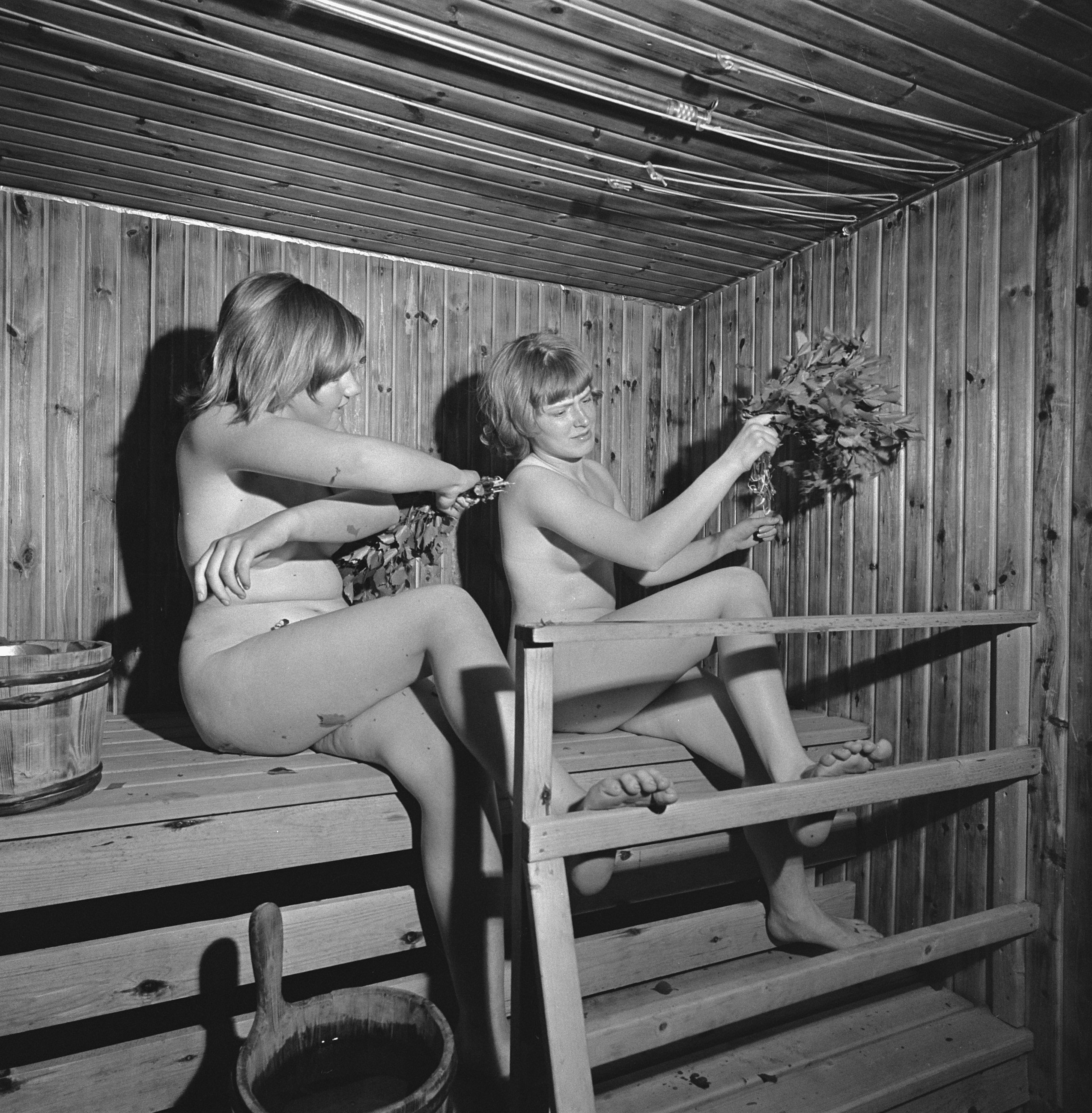
Women in sauna with Vihtas

Sauna is a type of dry steam bath practiced widely in Finland. The word is of Proto-Finnish origin (found in Finnic and Sámi languages) dating back 7,000 years. The sauna is mainly regarded as a way to bathe and relax after hard work, but traditionally it also served other purposes, such as a place for curing meat (specifically in a sauna variation called "smoke sauna") and providing a sterile environment for childbirth. In the 2020s, sauna remains a regular practice among Finns of all ages, with almost approximately 3.2 million saunas in the country.

Sauna is traditionally heated with wood, and many saunas in the countryside and at summer cottages still use this method. Since the later twentieth century, electric saunas have become more common, especially in urban settings.

A Finnish sauna is set to about 60–100 °C (sometimes up to 120 °C), and small amounts of water are thrown on rocks atop the stove (kiuas) emit steam (löyly), which produces a heat sensation. Some Finns prefer the "dry sauna" using very little steam if any. Birch branches (vihta or vasta) can be used to beat the body to stimulate blood circulation. Sauna includes the process of perspiring and cooling several times. Part of the cooling can be taking a swim in the lake, or drinking a cold beverage. The hot-cool cycles are typically not timed, with every person deciding the duration based on personal preference.

Finns typically go to sauna naked, sitting on a small napkin called pefletti. In mixed gender groups, swimsuits or towels are worn. Loud talking is discouraged as the sauna is regarded as a place for soothing the mind and contemplation.

Steam baths have been part of European tradition elsewhere as well, but the sauna has survived best in Finland, in addition to Sweden, the Baltic States, Russia, Norway, and parts of the United States and Canada. Most Finnish houses have either their own sauna or, in multistory apartment houses, a timeshare sauna. Public saunas were previously common, but the tradition has declined when saunas have been built nearly everywhere (private homes, municipal swimming halls, hotels, corporate headquarters, gyms, etc.).

== Literature ==
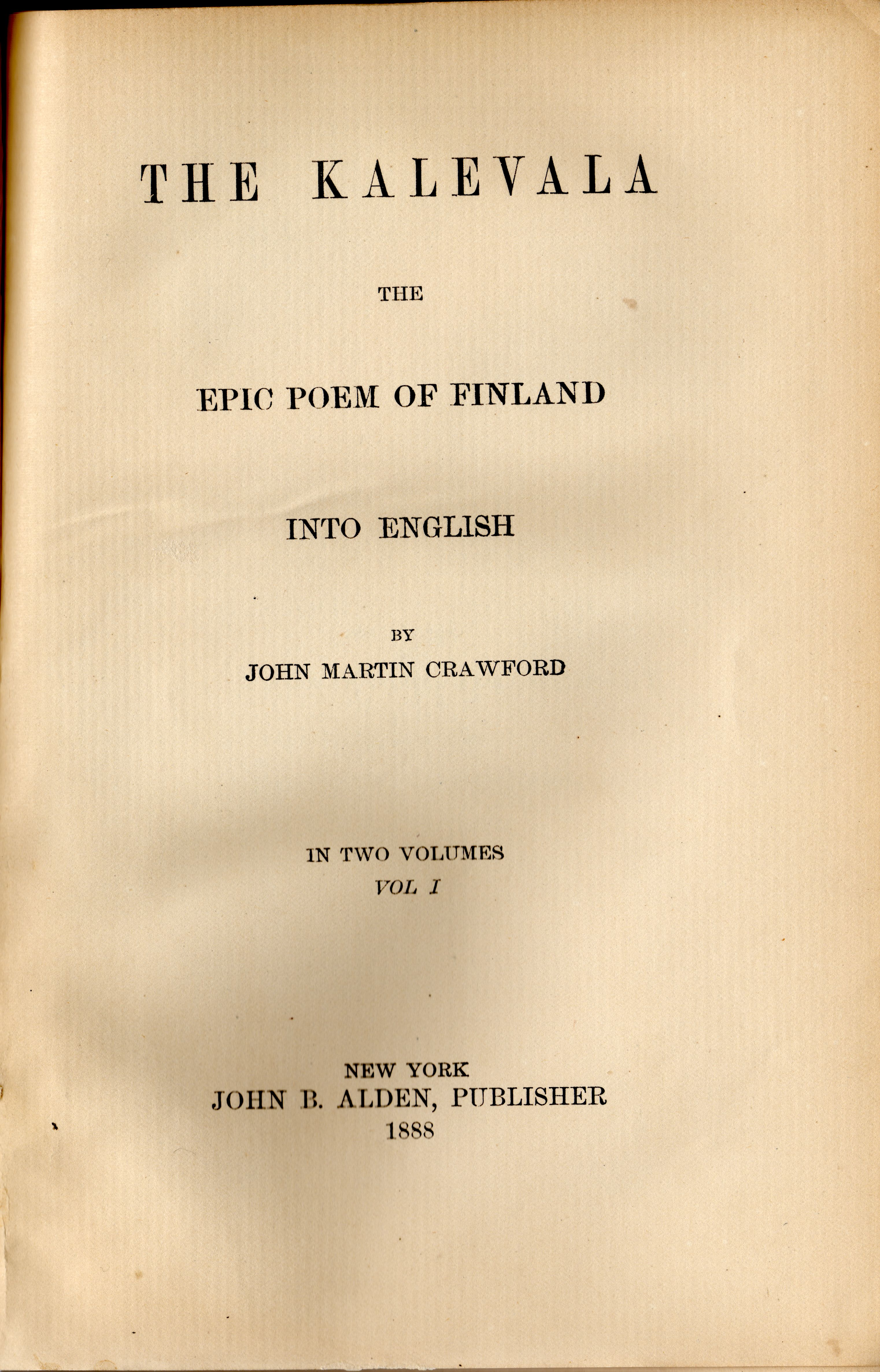
Kalevala. The national epic of Finland. Translated by John Martin Crawford, 1888.

Written Finnish can be said to have existed since Mikael Agricola translated the New Testament into Finnish during the Protestant Reformation in the 16th century. However, few notable works of literature were produced until the 19th century, which marked the emergence of a Finnish national Romantic Movement. This period prompted Elias Lönnrot to collect Finnish and Karelian folk poetry and to arrange and publish them as the Kalevala, the Finnish national epic. The era saw a rise of poets and novelists writing in Finnish, most notably the national writer Aleksis Kivi (The Seven Brothers), as well as Minna Canth, Eino Leino, and Juhani Aho, who was nominated for the Nobel Prize in Literature twelve times.

Alongside Finnish-language literature, many authors of the national awakening wrote in Swedish. Prominent among them were the national poet Johan Ludvig Runeberg (The Tales of Ensign Stål) and Zachris Topelius, whose works occupy a central place in Finland-Swedish literature.

Following Finland’s independence, modernist tendencies gained prominence. This development was exemplified by the Finland-Swedish poet Edith Södergran, while Finnish-language authors increasingly explored national, historical, and social themes. Key figures of the early and mid-20th century include Frans Eemil Sillanpää, who was awarded the Nobel Prize in Literature in 1939, the historical novelist Mika Waltari, and Väinö Linna, whose works The Unknown Soldier and the Under the North Star trilogy became central texts of post-war Finnish literature. From the 1950s onwards, Finnish poetry embraced modernism, beginning with Paavo Haavikko.

In contemporary Finnish literature, a wide range of genres and styles coexist. Detective fiction and popular literature have enjoyed particular success, with authors such as Ilkka Remes and Juha Vuorinen reaching large audiences. At the same time, the Finland-Swedish writer and artist Tove Jansson has become one of Finland’s most internationally recognised authors. Best known as the creator of The Moomins, she is among the most translated Finnish writers, and her work has had a lasting impact on Finnish and international popular culture, extending far beyond literature into visual media, museums, and other cultural forms.

== Visual arts ==
Innovative functionalist movements have distinguished design of furniture, ceramics, glass, and textiles as well the Finnish architecture. Finnish design combines local artistic themes with tools and materials adapted to demanding northern conditions. Many artists and architects, from Akseli Gallen-Kallela to Alvar Aalto, have designed furniture and tableware during their career.

Forces, shapes, colors, and textures of the northern landscape and the human relationship to nature have strongly influenced also painting, sculpture, and other art forms. This is particularly evident in the representational romantic nationalism that blossomed at the end of the 19th century.

Abstract art movements did not gain a foothold until the 1950s. When Sam Vanni's monumental painting Contrapunctus (1959) won competition for mural in Helsinki, abstract art was considered to be accepted and established in Finland. In recent years, however, graphic artists have experimented with innovative processes of image production and multimedia technologies to create new forms of art that sometimes serve as critiques of society and technology.

The Finnish contemporary art scene became much more visible than before with the establishment of Kiasma, the Museum of Contemporary Art in Helsinki in 1998.

== Architecture ==
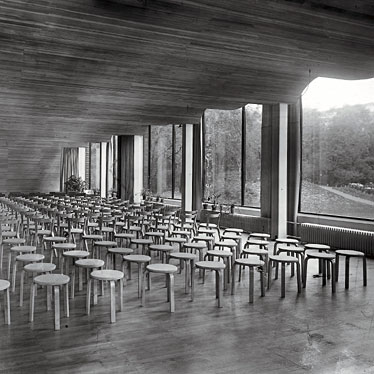
Alvar Aalto, Viipuri Library (1927–35)

The architecture of Finland has a notable history spanning over 800 years. As a land of predominating forests, wood provided the natural building material for both housing and public buildings up until the 20th century. The more limited history of stone buildings before the 19th century was realised, however, in various stone churches, castles and fortresses. Finnish architecture has contributed significantly to several styles internationally, such as Jugendstil (or Art Nouveau), Nordic Classicism and Functionalism.

Three of the world's most noted figures in architecture history were Finns; Eliel Saarinen was a major influence in Art Nouveau architecture, with such buildings as the Helsinki Central railway station and, following his emigration to the US, the Cranbrook Academy of Art in Michigan. His son, Eero Saarinen, though born in Finland is also regarded as an American architect, and created significant pieces of architecture throughout the US, including the TWA Flight Center at New York's Kennedy Airport and the Gateway Arch in St. Louis. The works of Finland's most noted modernist architect, Alvar Aalto, regarded as one of the major figures in the world history of modern architecture, has had significant worldwide influence; he was instrumental in bringing functionalist architecture to Finland, but also made his reputation for developing a more organic style of modernist architecture. Among his most famous buildings are Viipuri Library, Vyborg and the Baker House dormitory at Massachusetts Institute of Technology, Cambridge, Massachusetts, US. Aalto is also famous for his work in furniture (e.g. the Paimio chair) and glassware (e.g. Savoy vase).

== Music ==
=== Folk music ===
Much of the folk music of Finland is influenced by traditional eastern Finnish e.g. Karelian melodies and lyrics, and the western parts of the country were influenced by Nordic dance music. Traditional form of singing, rune-singing i.e. poem singing was preserved better in the eastern Finland, and it was often accompanied by the traditional instrument kantele. This type of music is often seen as more pure form of traditional music, since it lacks Germanic influence. Since Nordic dance music became popular the popularity of the poem singing has been diminishing, but Finnish folk music has undergone a roots revival in recent decades and has become a part of popular music, for example, the group Värttinä.

=== Sami music ===
The people of northern Finland, Sweden, and Norway, the Sami, are known primarily for highly spiritual songs called Joik. The same word sometimes refers to lavlu or vuelie songs, though this is technically incorrect.

=== Classical and opera ===
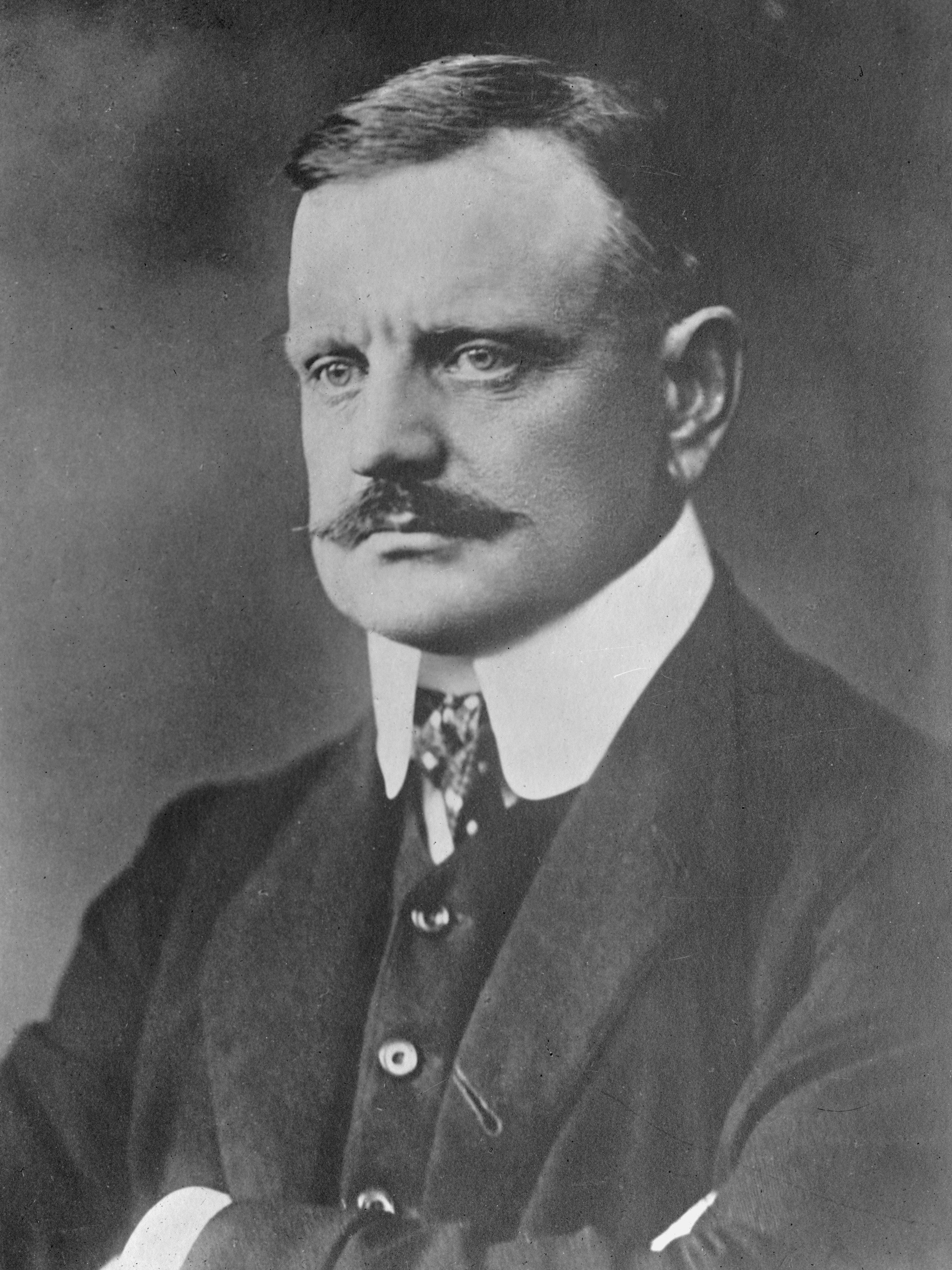
The Finnish composer Jean Sibelius (1865–1957), a significant figure in the history of classical music

The first Finnish opera was written by the German composer Fredrik Pacius in 1852. Pacius also wrote Maamme/Vårt land (Our Land), Finland's national anthem. In the 1890s Finnish nationalism based on the Kalevala spread, and Jean Sibelius became famous for his vocal symphony Kullervo. He soon received a grant to study runo singers in Karelia and continued his rise as the first prominent Finnish musician. In 1899 he composed Finlandia, which played its important role in Finland gaining independence. He remains one of Finland's most popular national figures and is a symbol of the nation.

Finland's classical music scene is vibrant today, even though Finnish classical music has been around for only about a century. Notable composers include Magnus Lindberg, Kaija Saariaho, Aulis Sallinen, and Einojuhani Rautavaara. The composers are accompanied by a large number of great conductors such as Sakari Oramo, Mikko Franck, Esa-Pekka Salonen, Osmo Vänskä, Jukka-Pekka Saraste, Susanna Mälkki, and Leif Segerstam. Some of the internationally acclaimed Finnish classical musicians are Karita Mattila, Soile Isokoski, Kari Kriikku, Pekka Kuusisto, Réka Szilvay, and Linda Brava.

=== Popular music ===
Modern Finnish popular music includes a renowned heavy metal music scene, in common with other Nordic countries, as well as a number of prominent rock bands, hip hop performers, pop music and dance music acts such as Bomfunk MCs, Darude and Waldo's People. Jazz also plays a role in the Finnish Music scene. Some important Jazz Musicians are the brothers Heikki and Pekka Sarmanto, Jukka Linkola, Keith Hall (UK), Esko Linnavalli and Vladimir Schafranov (Russia). There are numerous Jazz Clubs in Finland, such as Storyville, The Hot Tomato and UMO Jazz Club (UMO is the acronym for Uuden Musiikin Orkesteri, meaning the"New Music Orchestra). Finnish electronic music such as the Sähkö Recordings record label enjoys underground acclaim. Iskelmä (coined directly from the German word Schlager, meaning hit) is a traditional Finnish word for a light popular song. Finnish popular music also includes various kinds of dance music; tango, a style of Argentine music, is also popular. One of the most productive composers of popular music was Toivo Kärki, and the most famous singer Olavi Virta (1915–1972). Among the lyricists, Sauvo Puhtila (1928–2014), Reino Helismaa (died 1965) and Veikko "Vexi" Salmi are a few of the most notable writers. The composer and bandleader Jimi Tenor is well known for his brand of retro-funk music.

=== Dance music ===
Notable Finnish dance and electronic music artists include Jori Hulkkonen, Darude, JS16, DJ Proteus, Fanu, DJ Muffler, trance duo Super8 & Tab and DJ Orkidea. Finnish dance music is also known for Suomisaundi, a kind of freestyle psychedelic trance that originated in Finland around the mid-1990s.

=== Rock and heavy metal music ===
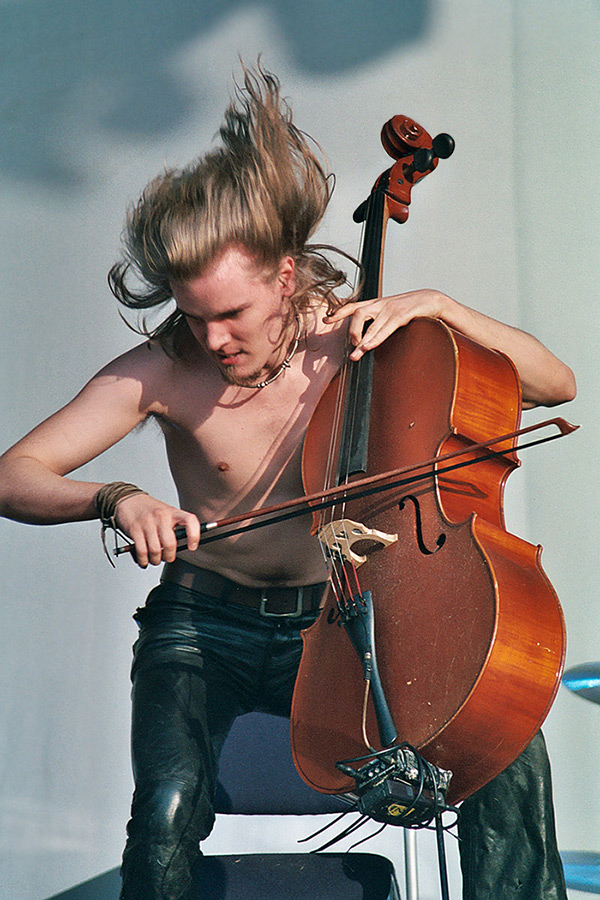
Apocalyptica's Perttu Kivilaakso playing metal music live

The Finnish rock music scene emerged in the 1960s, pioneered by artists such as Blues Section and Kirka. In the 1970s Finnish rock musicians started to write their own music instead of translating international hits into Finnish. During the decade some progressive rock groups, such as Tasavallan Presidentti and Wigwam, gained respect abroad but failed to make a commercial breakthrough outside Finland. This was also the fate of the rock and roll group, Hurriganes. The Finnish punk scene produced some internationally respected names including Terveet Kädet in the 1980s. Hanoi Rocks was a pioneering 1980s glam rock act that left perhaps a deeper mark in the history of popular music than any other Finnish group by being an influence for groups such as Guns N' Roses.

In 1990s Finnish rock and metal music started to gain international fame with such bands as The 69 Eyes, Amorphis, Children of Bodom, Ensiferum, Norther, Wintersun, HIM, Impaled Nazarene, Lordi, Negative, Nightwish, The Rasmus, Sentenced, Sonata Arctica, Stratovarius, and Tarja Turunen, a solo artist, who is popular for mixing classical music with Metal/Rock. In the late 1990s the cello metal group Apocalyptica played Metallica cover versions as cello quartettos and sold half a million records worldwide. Some of the Finland's most domestically popular rock groups are CMX and Eppu Normaali. Finland also helped bring folk metal music more popularity, through bands such as Finntroll, Moonsorrow and Turisas.

In the 2000s Finnish rock bands started to sell well internationally. The Rasmus finally captured Europe (and other places, like South America) in the 2000s. Their 2003 album Dead Letters sold 1.5 million units worldwide and garnered them eight gold and five platinum albums designations. But so far the most successful Finnish band in the United States has been HIM; they were the first band from Finland to ever sell an album that was certified gold by the RIAA. Most recently, the Finnish hard rock/heavy metal band Lordi won the 2006 Eurovision Song Contest with a record 292 points, giving Finland its first ever victory. Rock bands such as The 69 Eyes and Indica enjoy cult following abroad.

Tuska Open Air Metal Festival, one of the largest open-air heavy metal music festivals in the world, is held annually in Kaisaniemi, Helsinki. Ruisrock and Provinssirock are the most famous rock festivals held in Finland.

== Entertainment and games ==
Finland has a number of soap operas and television reality series, such as Salatut elämät and Vain elämää.

Madventures is a very popular Finnish travel documentary television series.

Sketches are a popular form of humor in Finland. Comedy has a strong representation, with some examples of popular artists being Kari Ketonen, Ville Myllyrinne, Ali Jahangiri, André Wickström, Ismo Leikola, Krisse Salminen and Pirjo Heikkilä.

In 2014 Ismo Leikola was named as the "Funniest Person in the World" in a stand-up comedy competition held by Laugh Factory in the United States.

YouTube videos and video blogs have found their audience in second half of the 2010s. Tubecon YouTube event gathers thousands of fans to meet the most popular Finnish YouTube creators.

Games are recognized as a form of culture in Finland. Professional game development has a strong basis in education, In 2015, there are over 20 educational institutions providing game education in all educational levels. The first commercial Finnish digital game was published in 1979 and the first globally distributed game in 1986. In 2009, Angry Birds of Rovio Entertainment became a big hit. Rovio is a Finnish developer, publisher, distributor of video games and is an entertainment company headquartered in Espoo, Finland. Also, Remedy Entertainment, notable for creating games such as Max Payne, Alan Wake, Quantum Break and Control, were established in Espoo.

The throwing game of Mölkky originated in Finland.

== Cinema ==
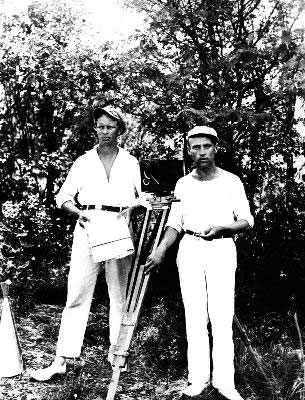
Erkki Karu, one of the pioneers of the Finnish cinema, with cinematographer Eino Kari in 1927

Finland has a growing film industry with a number of famous directors such as Aki Kaurismäki, Timo Koivusalo, Aleksi Mäkelä and Klaus Härö. Hollywood film director/producer Renny Harlin (born Lauri Mauritz Harjola) was born in Finland.

== Media and communications ==
Finland is one of the most advanced information societies in the world. There are 200 newspapers; 320 popular magazines, 2,100 professional magazines and 67 commercial radio stations, with one nationwide, six national public service radio channels (three in Finnish, two in Swedish, one in Sami); digital radio has three channels. Four national analog television channels (two public services and two commercial) were fully replaced by five public services and three commercial digital television channels on 1 September 2007.

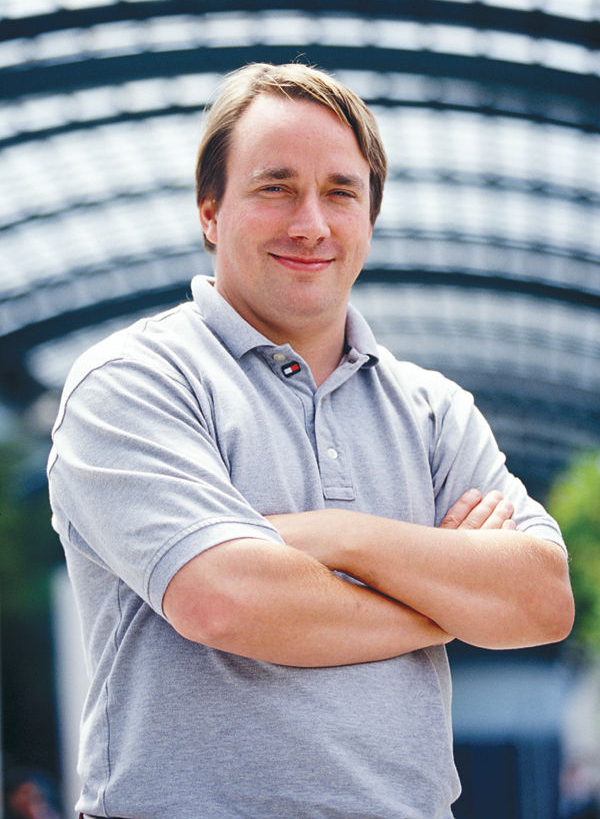
Linus Torvalds, a famous Fennoswede software engineer, best known for initiating the development of the Linux kernel

Broadband access is a legal right, and by 2015 over 93% of population was online.

In 2015, 95% of Finns read a newspaper (in print or online) at least once per week – which was the highest value in countries compared by Reuters (including Denmark (87%) UK (73%) and USA (56%). The most read newspaper in Finland is Helsingin Sanomat, with a circulation of 267,000. The media group Sanoma behind Helsingin Sanomat also publishes the newspaper Aamulehti, tabloid Ilta-Sanomat and commerce-oriented Taloussanomat. It also owns the Nelonen television channel. Sanoma's largest shareholders are Aatos Erkko's family foundation and Antti Herlin. The other major publisher Alma Media publishes almost thirty magazines, including tabloid Iltalehti and commerce-oriented Kauppalehti. Finland has been at the top of the worldwide Press Freedom Index list every year since the publication of the first index by Reporters Without Borders in 2002.

In 2015, there were 765 public libraries, which were visited over 49 million times. Over 10,000 books and 46 daily (4–7 times a week) newspapers were published. 311 movie theatres showed 202 new films.

Finland's National Broadcasting Company Yle is an independent state-owned company. It has five television channels and 13 radio channels in two national languages. Yle is funded through a television license and private television broadcasting license fees. Ongoing transformation to digital TV broadcasting is in progress – analog broadcasts ceased on the terrestrial network 31 August 2007 on cable at the end of February 2008. The most popular television channel MTV3 and the most popular radio channel Radio Nova are owned by Nordic Broadcasting (Bonnier and Proventus).

The people of Finland are accustomed to technology and information services. The number of cellular phone subscribers as well as the number of Internet connections per capita in Finland is among the highest in the world. According to the Ministry of Transport and Communications, Finnish mobile phone penetration exceeded fifty percent of the population as far back as August 1998 – first in the world – and by December 1998 the number of cell phone subscriptions outnumbered fixed-line phone connections. By the end of June 2007, there were 5.78 million cellular phone subscriptions, or 109 percent of the population.

Another fast-growing sector is the use of the Internet. Finland had more than 1.52 million broadband Internet connections by the end of June 2007 (about 287 per 1,000 inhabitants). The Finns are not only connected; they are heavy users of Internet services. All Finnish schools and public libraries have been connected to the Internet for years.

Finland is also internationally known for major demoscene achievements, particularly due to Assembly, the largest annual demo party.

== Cuisine ==
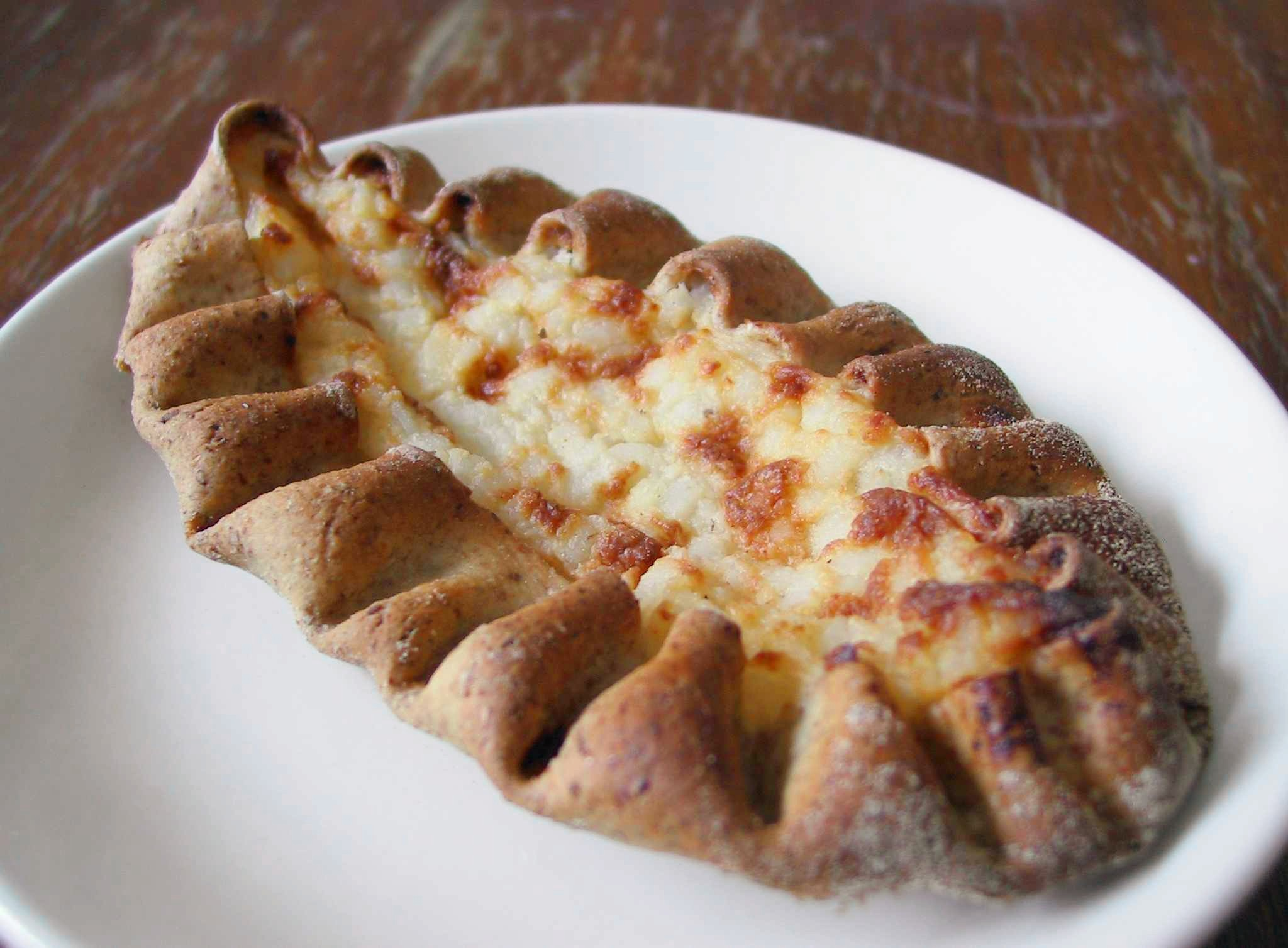
Karjalanpiirakka, a traditional Finnish pastry

Traditional Finnish cuisine is a combination of European, Fennoscandian and Western Russian elements; table manners are European. The food is generally simple, fresh and healthy. Historically, Finns have relied on the abundant natural resources of their country, drawing sustenance from its vast forests and lakes. When crops failed, survival was sustained through the consumption of fish sourced from the sea and lakes, game hunted from the wilderness, as well as mushrooms and berries gathered from the forests and fields. Meat, berries, milk and ground vegetables are typical ingredients whereas spices are not common due to their historical unavailability.

Finland is widely renowned for its rich bread culture, exemplified by its diverse range of breads, from sour rye to kalakukko – a "fish rooster" encased in a hearty rye crust. These "roosters" come in many varieties, originally developed as a way to preserve food. The thick rye crust ensured the filling would not spoil during long journeys.

Various casseroles based on root vegetables are also a popular staple in Finnish cuisine. Some include lanttulaatikko, made primarily from rutabaga mixed with syrup, breadcrumbs, and often seasoned with spices like nutmeg, porkkanalaatikko, made with carrots, ground pork (sometimes mixed with ground beef), rice, and seasoned with spices like allspice or black pepper, and perunasoselaatikko, made from mashed potatoes mixed with milk, butter, and sometimes eggs.

Finland imports just 9% of its consumed meat, with a per capita meat consumption of sixty-six kilograms per person, the lowest in Europe. In years past, Finnish food often varied from region to region, most notably between the west and east. In coastal and lakeside villages, fish was a main feature of cooking, whereas, in the eastern and also northern regions, vegetables and game were more common. In Finnish Lapland, reindeer was also important.

The prototypical breakfast is oatmeal or other continental-style foods such as bread. Lunch is usually a full warm meal, served by a canteen at workplaces. Dinner is eaten at around 17.00 to 18.00 at home, and it is also common to have supper later in the evening.

Modern Finnish cuisine combines country fare and haute cuisine with contemporary continental cooking style. Today, spices are a prominent ingredient in many modern Finnish recipes, having been adopted from the east and west in recent decades.

== Sports ==
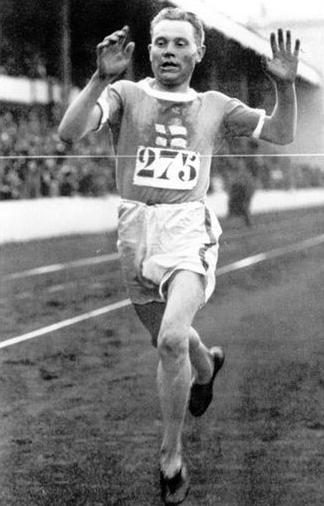
Paavo Nurmi at the 1920 Summer Olympics

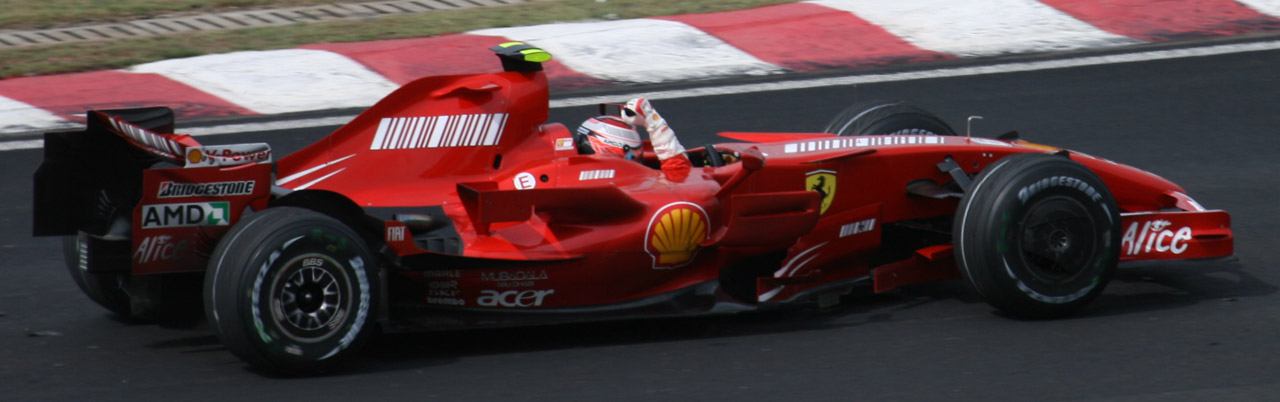
2007 Formula One World Champion Kimi Räikkönen celebrating victory at the 2007 Brazilian Grand Prix

Various sporting events are popular in Finland. Pesäpallo (reminiscent of baseball) is the national sport of Finland, although the most popular sports in Finland in terms of media coverage and audience attendance are Formula One, ice hockey, track and field, football and harness racing. However, in terms of actually playing sports, the most popular ones in terms of people registered to a club are football and horse-riding.

The Finnish national ice hockey team is considered one of the best in the world and has won the world championships five times in 1995, 2011, 2019, 2022 and 2026 and Olympic gold in 2022. During the past century there has been a rivalry in sporting between Finland and Sweden, mostly in ice hockey and athletics (Finland-Sweden athletics international). Jari Kurri and Teemu Selänne are the two Finnish-born ice hockey players to have scored 500 goals in their NHL careers. Association football is also popular in Finland, with the national football team recently qualifying for the European Football Championships 2021, their first major international tournament. Jari Litmanen and Sami Hyypiä are the most internationally renowned of the Finnish football players.

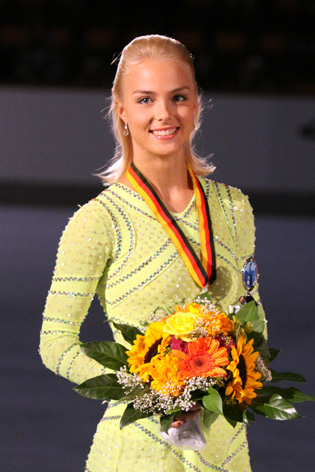
In 2011 figure skater Kiira Korpi was ranked 4th in the world.

Relative to its population, Finland has been a top country in the world in automobile racing, measured by international success. Finland has produced three Formula One World Champions – Keke Rosberg (Williams, 1982), Mika Häkkinen (McLaren, 1998 and 1999) and Kimi Räikkönen (Ferrari, 2007). Along with Räikkönen, the other Finnish Formula One driver currently active is Valtteri Bottas. Other notable Finnish Grand Prix drivers include Leo Kinnunen, JJ Lehto, Mika Salo and Heikki Kovalainen. Finland has also produced most of the world's best rally drivers, including the ex-WRC World Champion drivers Marcus Grönholm, Juha Kankkunen, Hannu Mikkola, Tommi Mäkinen, Timo Salonen and Ari Vatanen. The only Finn to have won a road racing World Championship, Jarno Saarinen, was killed in 1973 while racing.

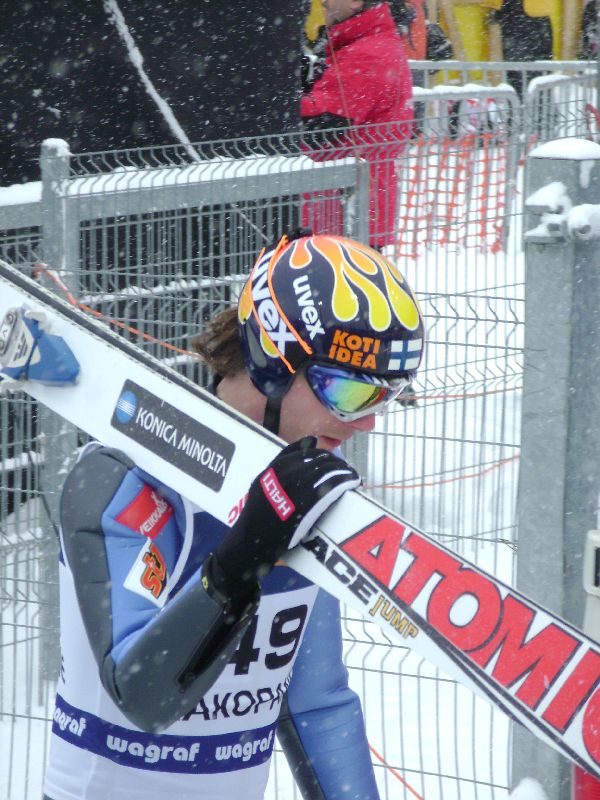
Janne Ahonen is considered one of the best and most successful currently active ski jumpers.

Among winter sports, Finland has been the most successful country in ski jumping, with former ski jumper Matti Nykänen being arguably the best ever in that sport. Most notably, he won five Olympic medals (four gold) and nine World Championships medals (five gold). Among currently active Finnish ski jumpers, Janne Ahonen has been the most successful. Kalle Palander is a well-known alpine skiing winner, who won the World Championship and Crystal Ball (twice, in Kitzbühel). Tanja Poutiainen has won an Olympic silver medal for alpine skiing, as well as multiple FIS World Cup races.

Some of the most outstanding athletes from the past include Hannes Kolehmainen (1890–1966), Paavo Nurmi (1897–1973) and Ville Ritola (1896–1982) who won eighteen gold and seven silver Olympic medals in the 1910s and 1920s. They are also considered to be the first of a generation of great Finnish middle and long-distance runners (and subsequently, other great Finnish sportsmen) often named the "Flying Finns". Another long-distance runner, Lasse Virén (born 1949), won a total of four gold medals during the 1972 and 1976 Summer Olympics.

Also, in the past, Riku Kiri, Jouko Ahola and Janne Virtanen have been the greatest strength athletes in the country, participating in the World's Strongest Man competition between 1993 and 2000.

The 1952 Summer Olympics, officially known as the Games of the XV Olympiad, were held in 1952 in Helsinki, Finland. Other notable sporting events held in Finland include the 1983 and 2005 World Championships in Athletics, among others.

Some of the most popular recreational sports and activities include floorball, Nordic walking, running, cycling and skiing.

== International business ==
Finns are comfortable and adept at working in international contexts, if notably reserved in demeanor. Many Finnish corporations do business throughout the Nordic and Baltic region, as well as globally. There is a strong tradition of professional business etiquette, focused more on relationship-building and effective communications than on superficial protocols and they prefer to speak plainly and openly; however, they do not need personal relationships in order to conduct business. Many major corporations, such as Nokia, actively draw staff from around the globe and may use English as their house language. As English is a required subject, the majority of Finns (70%) have fluency for social and professional settings. Hosting international conferences is an important component of Helsinki's economy.

== List of cultural aspects ==
- List of Finns
- Suuret suomalaiset – a list of the "100 Greatest Finns" of all time as voted by the Finnish people in 2004.

Below are listed some of the characteristics of Finnishness. The term "Finnishness" is often referred to as the national identity of the Finnish people and its culture.

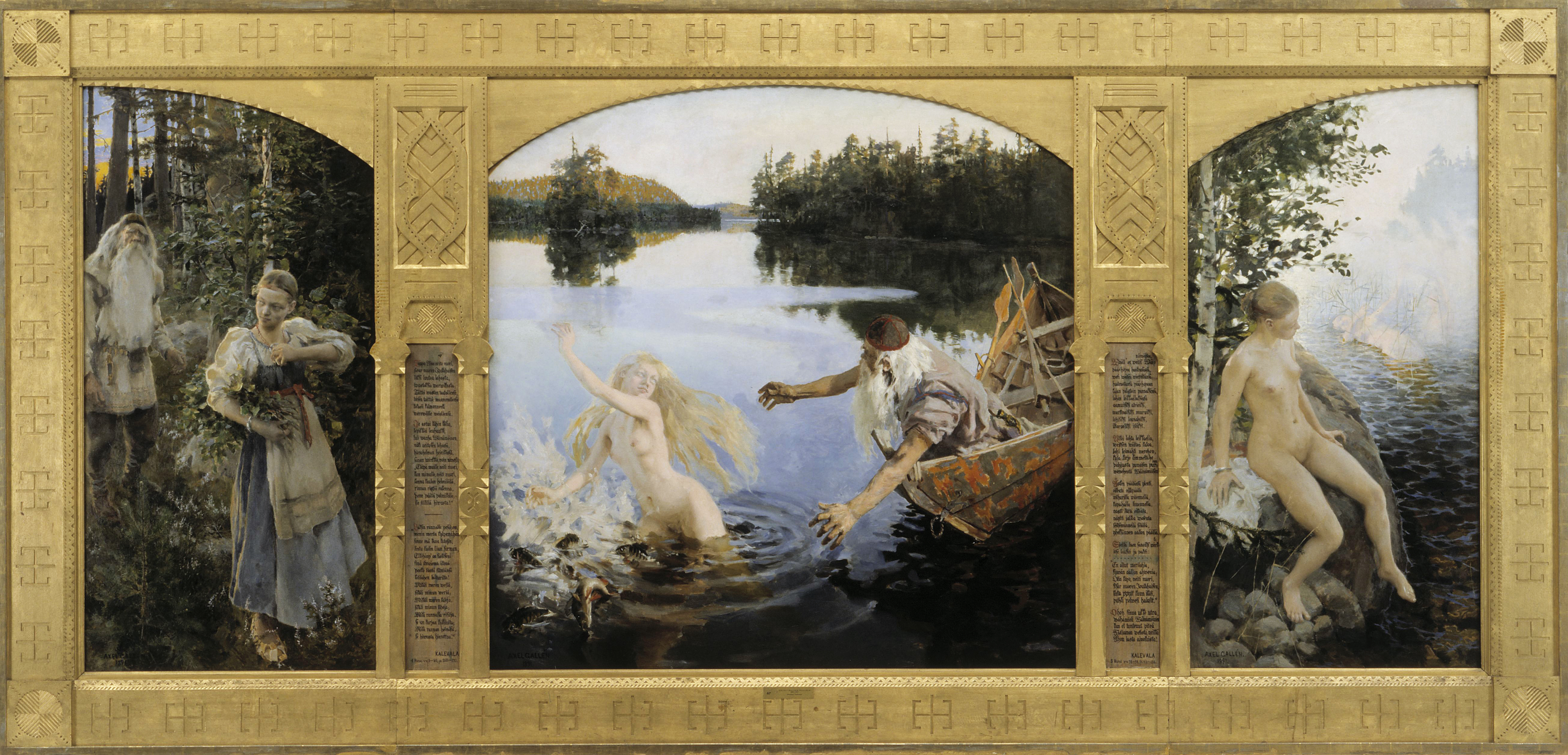
A triptych by Akseli Gallen-Kallela, depicting the Aino Story of Kalevala on three panes

Name	Description
Finnish Maiden	a figure of national personification symbolising Finland
Flying Finns	a nickname given to notable Finnish sportsmen (originated with Olympic medalist Hannes Kolehmainen)
Ice swimming	swimming in a body of water with a frozen crust of ice
Joulupukki	Father Christmas/Santa Claus
Kalakukko	traditional Savonian food
Kalevala	the national epic of Finland, and Finnish mythology in general
Kantele	traditional musical instrument
Karelian pasties	traditional pasties from the region of Karelia
Koskenkorva	Finnish vodka
Latin bastion	Finland has a reputation as a bastion of enthusiasm for Latin, thanks to such factors as the national broadcaster Yle's output of Nuntii Latini, a short weekly news service in Latin (from 1989 until the service was shut down in June 2019), and academic Jukka Ammondt's translation of songs by Elvis Presley into Latin.
Mämmi	traditional Easter food
Mustamakkara	traditional blood sausage from Tampere
Nordic walking	a recreational sport first popularized in Finland
Perkele	swear word (see Finnish profanity)
Puukko	traditional Finnish style woodcraft belt-knife
Reilu meininki	fair dealing
Ryijy	traditional Finnish long-tufted tapestry
Sahti	traditional beer
Salmiakki	salty liquorice
Sauna	a Finnish national institution (see also Finnish sauna)
Sibelius	one of the most popular national figures (composer of the symphonic poem Finlandia)
Sisu	will, determination, perseverance, mental fortitude
Talkoot	community work

== See also ==
- Culture of Finnish Americans
- Finnish national symbols
- Golden Age of Finnish Art
- Holidays in Finland, Flag flying days in Finland, Namesdays in Finland
- List of Finns
- List of bands from Finland

== Bibliography ==
- The World Book Encyclopedia (1990). Finland (Vol. 7), p. 117.
