= List of Suurkilpailu competitions =

A Suurkilpailu (Grand Race) is a harness racing event in Finland in which the purse for the winner is at or over 10,000 Euros (approximately 13,500 USD). All Grand Races are authorised by the Finnish trotting and breeding association, Suomen Hippos ry, the central horse organisation of Finland. The most important Grand Races are Finlandia-Ajo, St Michel and Kymi Grand Prix.

== Events for light trotters ==
Event	Admission	Qualification	Race	Prizes

Name	Place	Frequency	Admission	Total fees	Sex	Age	Birthplace	Other	Finals distance	First prize
Arvid Åvallin tammaderby	Vermo (Helsinki)	annual	open	200 EUR	mares	5 years	Finland	none	2100 m	20,000 EUR
Suur-Hollolan Best Lady	Jokimaa (Lahti)	annual	open; enrollment when the horse is 1 year old	450 EUR	mares	4 years or older	Finland	none	2140 m	^{2}
Lotteria-ajo^{1}	Joensuu, Jyväskylä, Kuopio, Lappeenranta, Mikkeli and Vieremä	annual	open	none	all	4 years or older	any	winnings below 100,000 EUR for mares, or below 60,000 EUR for geldings and stallions	2100 m; handicaps per winnings	^{2}
Derbyn Tammachampion	Vermo (Helsinki)	?	open enrollment, 10 competitors chosen by a winnings index	5 paid Suuri Suomalainen Derby admission fees	mares	4 years	any	in Finnish racing register	2100 m	^{2}
Erkki Rajakoski Memorial	Vermo (Helsinki)	?	open	none	all	3 years	any	international event	2100 m	^{2}
Eugen Pylvänäisen Muistoajo	Mikkeli	annual	open	none	all	4 years	any	maximum of 10 horses may participate	1609 m	^{2}
Festivaali-ajo	?	annual	open	none	all	4 years or older	any	a maximum of 12 horses may participate	1609 m	^{2}
Finlandia-ajo	Vermo (Helsinki)	annual	open	none	all	4 years or older	any	international; preliminaries may be held	1609 m	^{2}
Glenn Kosmos Memorial	Vermo (Helsinki)	?	open	none	all	4 years or older	any	international; preliminaries may be held	1609 m	^{2}
Hambo	Jokimaa (Lahti)	annual	open	four Suur-Hollola -ajo admission fees paid	all	3 years	any	international race; horses must be enrolled for the Suur-Hollola -ajo; a maximum of 12 horses may participate	2140 m	^{2}
Helsinki-ajo	Vermo (Helsinki)	?	open	-	all	4 years or older	any	international race	1609 m	^{2}
Isla-ajo	Kaustinen	annual	open	-	all	5 years	Finland	a maximum of 12 horses may participate; mares have a 20-metre handicap	2120 m, volting	^{2}
Joensuu-ajo	Joensuu	annual	open	-	all	4 years or older	Finland	a maximum of 10 horses may participate	2140 m	^{2}
Jokimaa Tekee Tähtiä	Jokimaa (Lahti)	annual	open	EUR 150	all	open	Finland	participating horses need to be registered for racing in Finland and may not have won more than EUR 17,000 as of the elimination race	2140 m	eliminations EUR 1200, finals EUR 10,000 in minimum per ^{2}

Notes

1. Name may change according to the main sponsor.
2. Prizes determined separately; according to the Suurkilpailu bylaws, the winner purse will be at or over 10,000 EUR.

== Events for coldblood trotters ==
Event	Admission	Qualification	Race	Prizes

Name	Place	Frequency	Admission	Total fees	Sex	Age	Birthplace	Other	Finals distance	First prize
Erilo-juoksu	?	annual	open	first Suomenhevosten Kriterium admission fee paid	all	5 to 6 years	any	Finnhorses	2100 m; handicaps by age and sex	^{1}
Erkon Pokaali	Vermo (Helsinki)	?	open	?	all	5 years or older	any	international	2100 m	^{1}
Keskisuomalainen Derby	Killeri (Jyväskylä)	annual	horses enrolled at the age of 2 years	220 EUR	all	5 years	any	Finnhorses; preliminaries may be held, a maximum of 12 horses may participate in the finals	2100 m	^{1}
Coldblood Suur-Hollola -ajo	Jokimaa (Lahti)	annual	enrolment when the horse is 1 year old	280 EUR; fee on the year of participation is 140 EUR	all	5 years or older	Finland	handicap of 20 m for 6-year-old males and 7-year-old or older females; 40 m for 7-year-old males; 60 m for males at or over 8 years; preliminaries may be held	2140 m	^{1}
L. Fabritius Memorial - Åbofemman	Turku	annual	?	-	all	5 years or older	any	Finnhorses, and Swedish and Norwegian coldbloods; a maximum of 12 horses may participate	2100 m	^{1}
Olympia-ajo	-	annual	?	-	all	5 years or older	any	three eliminations are held	2000 m or more	above the EUR 10,000 limit per ^{1}
Osuuspankki Grand Prix (coldblood)	-	annual	?	-	all	5 years or older	any	a maximum of 10 horses may participate	2100 m	^{1}
Oulu Express	Oulu	annual	?	EUR 240	all	4 years	any	Finnhorses	2100 m	^{1}

Notes

1. Prizes determined separately; according to the Suurkilpailu bylaws, the winner purse will be at or over 10,000 EUR.
2. Name may change according to the main sponsor.
