= Harness racing in Finland =

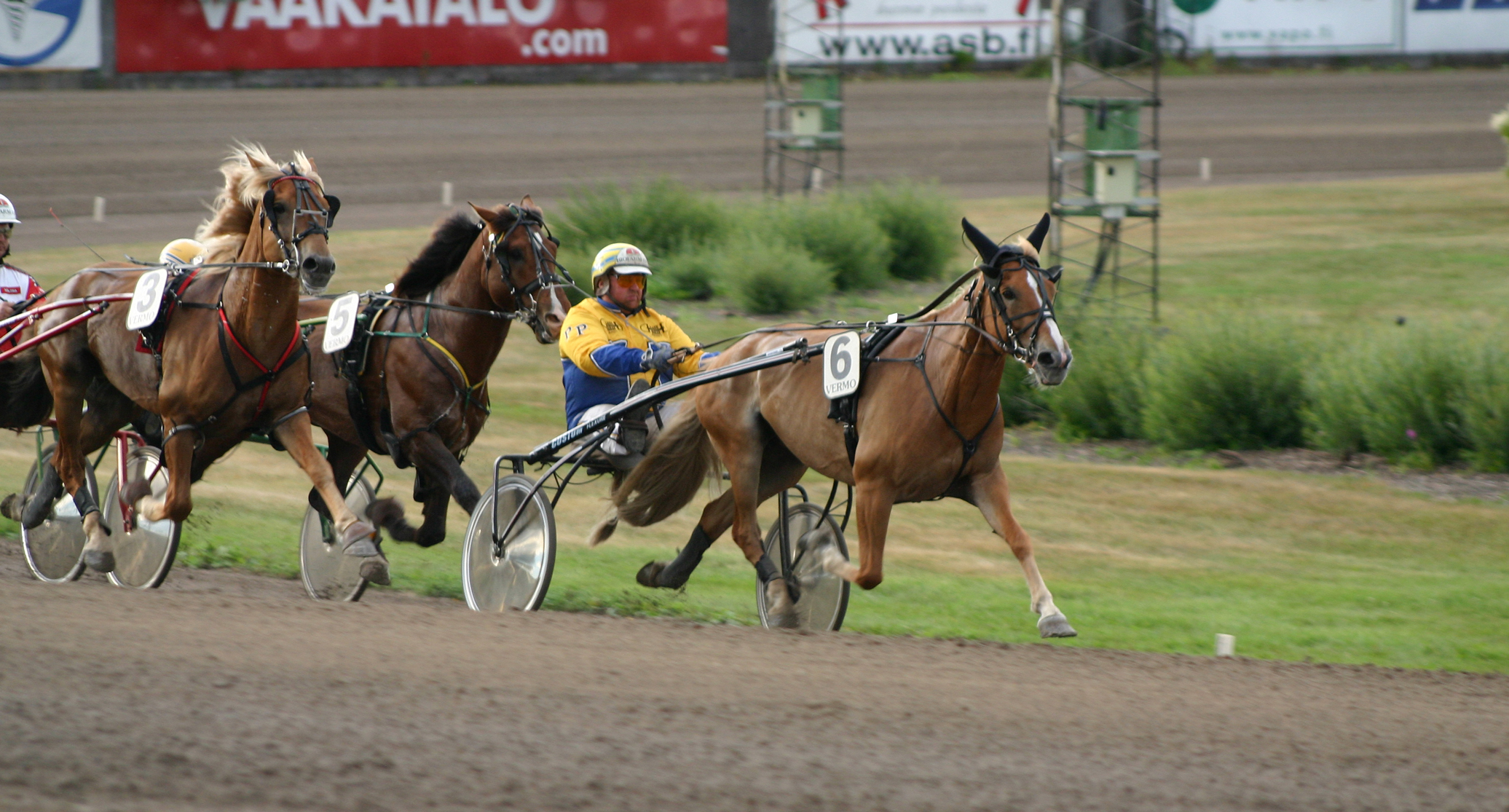
The use of the coldblood Finnhorses for racing is a unique feature of Finnish harness racing culture.

Harness racing in Finland is characterised by the use of the coldblood breed Finnhorse along with modern light trotters such as the Standardbred. With the lack of any gallop racing culture, harness racing is the main equestrian sport in Finland. Horses used for harness racing in Finland are exclusively trotters.

Racing back home from church had been a tradition long before the first organised race was held in 1817. Modern racing started in the 1960s, when light breeds were allowed to enter the sport and Parimutuel betting gained foothold as a pastime. Nowadays harness racing remains popular, with the main events gathering tens of thousands of spectators in the country with a population of some 5 million.

== History ==
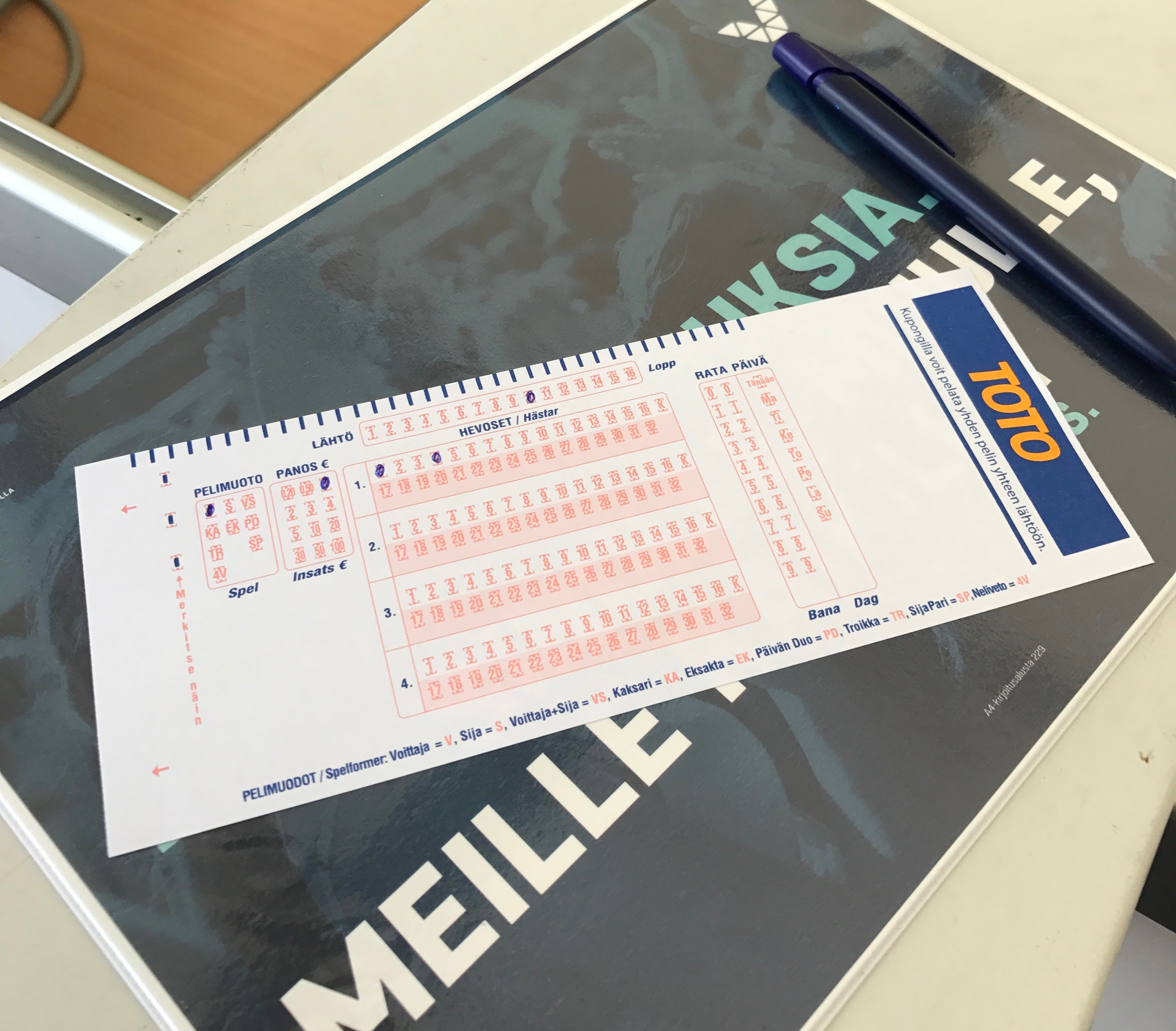
Veikkaus TOTO Lottery coupon

Harness racing in Finland developed from the practise of racing back home from church, and was a popular traditional recreational activity among farmers. The first organised race was held in Turku in 1817. In the 20th century, as mechanisation of agriculture in Finland reduced the need for farm horses, harness racing also started to decline. By the end of the 1950s, there were only half as many local races as had been held during the peak of harness racing's popularity in earlier decades. Likewise, the number of Finnhorses plummeted, as it seemed horses had no role in modern society. Until 1959, only Finnhorses were allowed to be raced in Finland. However, at the beginning of the 1960s, harness racing with Parimutuel betting began to grow and was promoted as a new form of recreation for city-dwellers. New racetracks were built and old ones renovated, while the addition of imported trotter breeds added a new feeling to the events. Thus harness racing, previously a farmers' hobby, took on a more professional air as light trotting breeds used specifically for sport, such as the Orlov Trotter and Standardbred, were introduced. In 1965, the Finnish Parimutuel betting regulations were changed to increase the payout percentage. This further increased interest in betting, and increased betting in turn made it possible to arrange more heats with larger purses, giving race horse breeders greater opportunities and incentives. From the 1960s to the 1970s the number of harness racing spectators quintupled, and the Finnhorse established its new use as a harness racing horse.

In 1965, the "universal horse" section of the Finnhorse studbook was replaced with a trotter section. While the total number of Finnhorses continued to diminish until 1987, the popularity of harness racing turned Finnhorse birthrates around from the historical low of the 1970s.

Harness racing continues to be a popular spectator sport, with the Kuninkuusravit competition having attracted more than 50,000 spectators in the beginning of the 2000s. 8000 horses are raced annually, and races are held on all days except for Christmas. The sport is the second most watched in Finland after ice hockey, with more than 800 000 spectators annually.

== Light horse racing ==
Light trotter breeds were first allowed to be raced in Finland in 1960. The first prevalent light breed used was the Russian Orlov Trotter. The speedier, crossbred Russian Trotter was soon introduced, and later on its major influence, the Standardbred. In the beginning, what material could be obtained from abroad was of low quality, and Finnish light trotter breeding was in a "trash dump" situation. Import regulations were tightened, but the breeding had already been founded on less than ideal stock. For about a decade, liberal crossbreeding between the Russian Trotter, French Trotter, and Standardbred breeds was carried out. In the 1980s, purebred Standardbred lines conquered the tracks for good, with the occasional French lines gaining success every now and then.

== Coldblood racing ==
Coldblood harness races, as separate from lighter trotters, have been held in Finland since the second half of the 19th century. The official annual Finnhorse racing championship, Kuninkuusravit was first offered 1924. The Finnhorse is the only coldblood breed raced in Finland. Due to the breed's greater speed, Finnhorses are not usually accepted into foreign coldblood heats. However, the national harness racing rules state that any regulations covering Finnhorses also cover other coldblood horses, allowing Swedish and Norwegian coldbloods to enter any coldblood heat not limited to Finnhorses, provided that they are appropriately registered.

Today, approximately 2 000 Finnhorses are in training and 3 000 are competing in harness racing. Finnhorse harness racing has recently decreased slightly, and occasionally coldblood heats have to be cancelled due to lack of participants. As of 2004, less than 35 percent of all harness racing heats were open for coldblood horses, more than 5 percental units less than in the early 1990s. Harness racing in general is not experiencing any such decline. The decrease of the popularity of the Finnhorse can be result from many factors. For instance, the expenses of horse keeping in Finland are high, so light trotters, usable for competition a year earlier than a Finnhorse, are economically more desirable. Light trotter heats also have higher purses, as they attract more competitors and thus collect more entry fees. However, the Finnhorse is not necessarily unprofitable: its build withstands competition better than light trotters, and thus can be raced for many years. Success with a Finnhorse may also be more easily achieved, as many Finnhorse trotters are trained and raced more or less as a hobby and can succeed without requiring the dedication or focus of a full-time professional. Finnhorses have been so successful against other coldblood trotter breeds of Scandinavia, that in the 21st century, Finnhorses have been admitted in Swedish and Norwegian races only by invitation.

=== Best coldbloods ===
The most successful Finnhorse harness racing champion in Finland to date is the stallion Viesker. Viesker won the stallions' annual championship and the title Ravikuningas ("Trotting King") five times in a row during 1996-2000, and was the first Finnhorse to break the "ghost limit" of 1.20,0 with his 1.19,9a (per kilometre) run in 2002, which remains the Finnish coldblood record as of 2010. When Viesker retired at the age of 15, Viesker was the first Finnish horse to have broken the limit of one million Euros in winnings.

The most successful Finnhorse trotter mare to date is I.P. Sukkula, born in 1988. She has won the mares' annual championship and the title Ravikuningatar ("Trotting Queen") three times, in 1996, 1999, and 2000. Her record is 1.23.2aly per one kilometre.

As of 2007, the current Finnhorse speed record 1.19,4aly (per kilometre, a short distance run), is held by the stallion Sipori. However, since this result was not achieved from a win, the time is not an official Finnish record.

== Tracks ==
The best known racing venues in Finland are the national main track, Vermo, and the Mikkeli track, known for its fastness, and a host for international events.

Central and provincial racing tracks

Name	Built	Location	Main events	Website
Kausala (Ravilinna)	1924	Kausala (Iitti)	Kausalan Helluntairavit	Kausalan ravirata - Raviradat.fi
Pilvenmäki	1927	Forssa		pilvenmaki.fi
Vermo	1977	Espoo (Helsinki)	Finlandia-Ajo	vermo.fi
Linnunlahti	1980	Joensuu	Joensuu-ajo; Sanomalehti Karjalaisen -ajo Erkki I. Pesosen muistoajo Provincial championships	joensuunravirata.fi
Killeri	1974	Jyväskylä	Killerin Eliitti Keskisuomalainen Derby	killeri.fi
Kajaani		Kajaani		kainuunravirata.com
Nikula		Kaustinen	Festivaaliravit	kaustisenravit.fi
Kouvola		Kouvola	Kymi Grand Prix Kymenlaakso-ajo; Kouvola-ajo; Valkeala-ajo; Jouni Kaikko Memorial Race	kouvolanravirata.com
Sorsasalo	1980	Kuopio		kuopionravirata.fi
Jokimaa		Lahti		
Lappee		Lappeenranta		
Mikkeli	early 1960s	Mikkeli	Suurmestaruusajot St. Michel -ajo	mikkelinravirata.fi
Äimärautio	1908	Oulu		oulunravit.fi
Pori		Pori		
Mäntyvaara		Rovaniemi		
Seinäjoki		Seinäjoki		
Teivo		Ylöjärvi (Tampere)		teivonravit.fi
Laivakangas		Tornio		tornionravit.fi
Metsämäki		Turku		turunhippos.fi
Vaasa		Vaasa		
Keskinen		Ylivieska		

== See also ==
- List of Suurkilpailu competitions, harness racing events in Finland with a purse over 10,000 Euros
