= Caisa =

International Cultural Centre in Finland

Coordinates: 60°10′18″N 24°56′47″E

Caisa is an International Cultural Centre in Helsinki, Finland. Located in Kallio near the city centre, it aims to support the multicultural development of the city by promoting the interaction of people from different countries, and by providing information about various cultures and about Finnish society.
