= National Advisory Board on Romani Affairs =

National Advisory Board in Finland

The National Advisory Board on Romani Affairs (Finnish: Romaniasiain neuvottelukunta, abbrev. RONK, previously known as the Advisory Board on Gypsy Affairs, Mustalaisasioiden neuvottelukunta) is an expert advisory body in Finland. It aims to foster cooperation between the Roma population in Finland and the authorities, to promote equality, and to eliminate discrimination. In addition, the advisory board seeks to create equal opportunities for the Roma to participate in Finnish society and to improve their economic, social, and cultural conditions.

Outside of Finland's borders, the advisory board actively takes part in pan-Nordic, European, and international cooperation to ensure that the Roma are treated equally and their living conditions are improved as stipulated in the Decree of the Council of State on the national advisory board on Roma Affairs and on the regional Advisory Boards on Roma Affairs (1019/2003).

== History ==
The advisory board was established in 1956 as the Advisory Board on Gypsy Affairs (Finnish: Mustalaisasioiden neuvottelukunta). In 1989, its name was changed to its current form.

== The board ==
The advisory board is based at the Finnish Ministry of Social Affairs and Health. The Finnish Government appoints each board for three years at a time. In addition to the chair and vice-chair, the board may have up to 16 additional members. Half of the advisory board is made up of representatives from the Finnish Roma community. The other half consists of representatives of the Ministry of Social Affairs and Health, the Ministry for Foreign Affairs, the Ministry of the Interior, the Ministry of Education and Culture, the Ministry of Economic Affairs and Employment, the Ministry of the Environment, and the Finnish National Agency for Education.

=== Board members for 2020–2022 ===
Position	Name
Chair	Tarja Filatov
Vice-chair	Henry Lindgren
Member	Rosita Ahlgren
	Inga Angersaari
	Måns Enqvist
	Katri Kairimo
	Taito Lehmusta
	Päivi Majaniemi
	Rauno Merisaari
	Henry Nyman
	Jorma Pietiläinen
	Jari Rajanen
	Miriam Schwartz
	Tanja Ståhlberg
	Helena Valentin
	Hannele Varsa
	Arto Zitron
	Tuula Åkerlund

== Regional boards ==
In addition to the national advisory board, there are four Regional Advisory Boards on Romani Affairs, which work on the local and regional level to achieve the same goals as the national board does nationwide.

1. The Regional Advisory Board on Romani Affairs in Southern Finland (Finnish: Etelä-Suomen alueellinen romaniasiain neuvottelukunta)
2. The Regional Advisory Board on Romani Affairs in Eastern Finland (Itä-Suomen alueellinen romaniasiain neuvottelukunta)
3. The Regional Advisory Board on Romani Affairs in Southwest Finland (Lounais-Suomen alueellinen romaniasiain neuvottelukunta)
4. The Regional Advisory Board on Romani Affairs in Northern Finland (Pohjois-Suomen alueellinen romaniasiain neuvottelukunta)
