= Tubecon =

Gathering event for YouTube creators and their audiences

- Status: Active
- Genre: Online Video
- Venue: Many, including Messukeskus (Helsinki) and more
- Locations: Many locations, including Helsinki, Stockholm and more
- Country: Many, including Finland, Sweden, Germany, Switzerland, Spain, Norway and more
- Inaugurated: August 2014; 12 years ago
- Most recent: 17–18 August 2018
- Attendance: 17,000 (Finland 2018)
- Organizer: Locals

Tubecon was a community-driven international YouTube event that gathers YouTube creators and their audiences in arena-sized public events. The first Tubecon took place in August 2014 in Hartwall Arena, Helsinki with over 5,000 visitors. Since then Tubecon has been organized 25 times in 4 different countries so far (Finland, Sweden, Spain and Switzerland) with altogether over 120,000 visitors in all the events.

In recent years Tubecon has grown significantly, as the YouTube and online influencer scene has also grown. The biggest Tubecon events have gathered over 18,000 visitors and featured over 200 YouTubers and online influencers.

Tubecon event program is built in collaboration with local online influencers and it includes multiple program elements such as Meet & Greets, Tubecon Video Awards, panels and concerts. In 2018 Tubecon is taking place in Finland, Sweden, Germany and Switzerland and letters of intent have been signed in Romania, Latvia and Austria.

== 2014 ==
Tubecon's began in 2014 when Finnish creators wanted to organize an event where they and their viewers could meet each other in a safe and fun way.

=== Performers ===
- Kasmir
- Justimusfilms
- MadCraft
- TCT
- Robin

They also presented Hartwall Arena's Minecraft version on the main stage.

== 2015 ==
Tubecon 2015 took place in Hartwall Arena in August 2015 with over 10,000 visitors.

== 2016 ==
=== Finland ===
The Finnish Tubecon took place from 12 to 13 August 2016 with the second event day being sold out. The event had all together 18,500 visitors.

=== Sweden ===
Tubecon in Sweden had its beginning on 6 January 2016 in Stockholm with more than 4,500 visitors. They also did a tour during autumn, which started on 9 September in Västerås and ended on 10 December in Kungsbacka. About 50 YouTube creators toured 8 cities in total. More than 15,000 people visited Tubecon events in Sweden during 2016.

=== Germany ===
The Tubecon took place in Germany on 20 February 2016 in the Turbinenhalle Oberhausen. Special VIP and Aftershow Tickets were also sold.

== 2017 ==
=== Finland ===
Finnish event was organized in Hartwall Arena on 12–13 August with around 17,500 visitors.

=== Spain ===
First ever Tubecon Spain was organized on 18 February in the wiZink Center in Madrid. The event had around 4,000 visitors and over 200 Spanish creators in attendance.

=== Switzerland ===
Tubecon Switzerland was organized for the first time in Zurich's Hallenstation on 29 December. Around 2,500 visitors took part to the event.

== 2018 ==
=== Finland ===
The Finnish Tubecon took place for the first time in Messukeskus Helsinki on 17–18 August. The event theme was "My Story". The event featured approximately 200 Finnish YouTubers. Tubecon hosted also international creators from the US, Great Britain, Germany and Thailand in the first ever Tubecon World Meet. International creators included Bars and Melody, Jon Cozart aka Paint, Softpomz and MrTrashPack. The event also introduced a new TubeCity concept, where different genres like gaming, beauty and fashion and food, had their own blocks in the city-like event space. As a new initiative, Tubecon also introduced Tube Academy, an educational track inviting creators and anyone who wanted to learn more about video making and the industry.
