= Finlandia-Ajo =

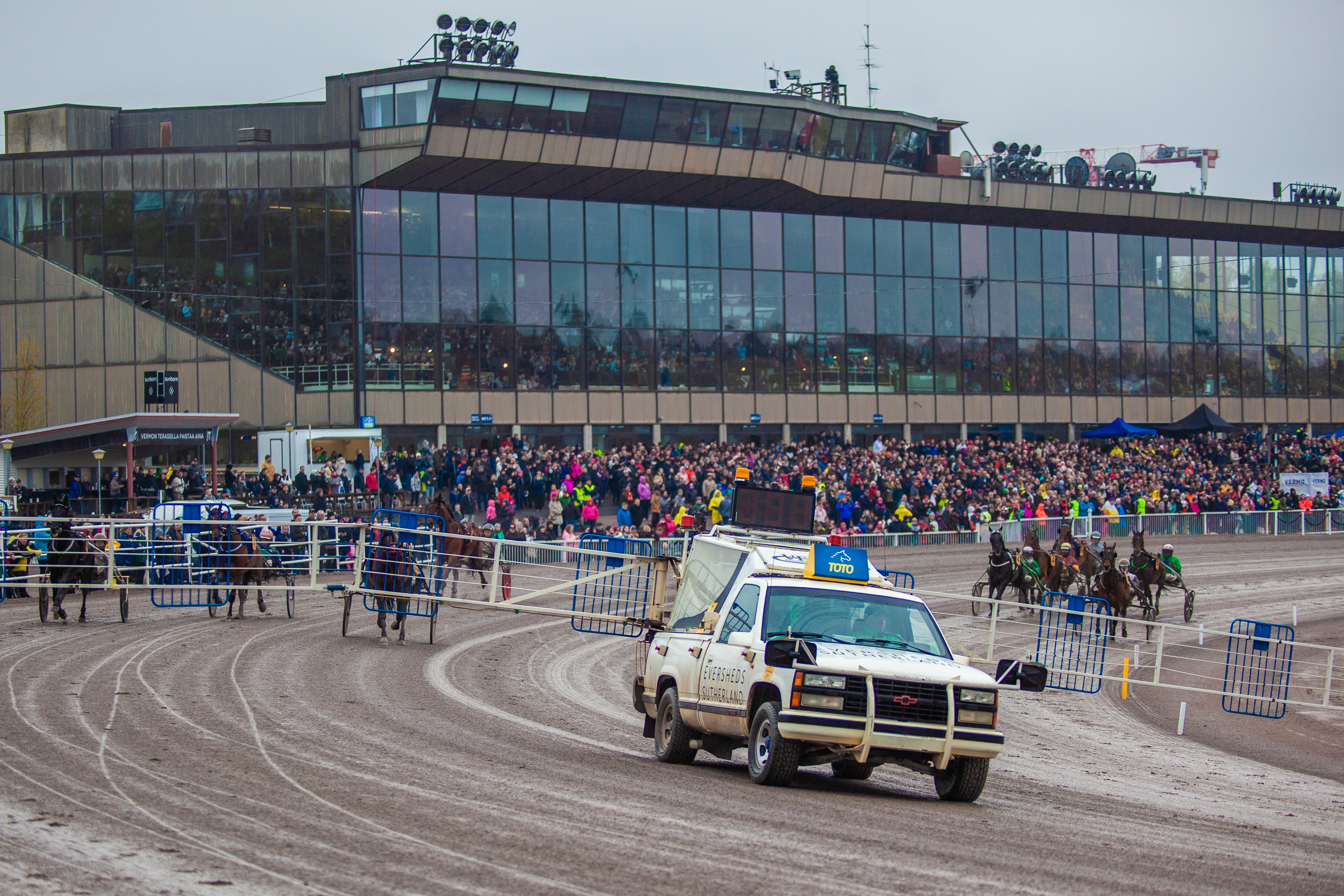
- Finlandia-ajo 2019
- Class: Group One International
- Location: Vermo Racetrack, Espoo, Finland
- Inaugurated: 1980
- Race type: Harness race for standardbred trotters
- Website: Hippos.fi - Finlandia-ajo(in Finnish)

Race information
- Distance: 1,609 meters (1 mile)
- Track: Left-handed 1,000 meter track (0.62 mile)
- Qualification: Age 4-14. Invitational
- Purse: €110,000 (≈US$116,000)

Finlandia-Ajo ("Finlandia Race") is an annual Group One harness event that takes place at Vermo Racetrack in Espoo, Finland. The competition, which was inaugurated in 1980, is regarded as Finland's biggest trotting event. It is raced over the mile, 1,609 meters. Finlandia-Ajo is part of the European Grand Circuit and the overall purse for the 2009 event was €190,000, equalling approximately US$247,000.

== Racing conditions ==
Finlandia-Ajo is decided through a one-mile race. The first eight years (1980–1987), the race was over a slightly shorter distance (1,600 meters, 0.99 mile), but since 1988, the distance has been one mile. The race has always been started by the use of auto start.

== Past winners ==
=== Horses with most wins ===
- 2 - Giesolo de Lou (1999, 2000)
- 2 - Napoletano (1988, 1989)

=== Drivers with most wins ===
- 4 - Jean-Michel Bazire (2005, 2008, 2009, 2011)
- 3 - Stig H. Johansson (1988, 1989, 2004)
- 3 - Jorma Kontio (1985, 1986, 2007)
- 2 - Olle Goop (1983, 1987)
- 2 - Joseph Verbeeck (1998, 2003)
- 2 - Björn Goop (2010, 2012)

=== Trainers with most wins ===
- 4 - Fabrice Souloy (2003, 2008, 2009, 2011)
- 3 - Olle Goop (1983, 1987, 2010)
- 2 - Jean-Etienne Dubois (1999, 2000)
- 2 - Stig Engberg (1988, 1989)

=== Sires with most winning offsprings ===
- 2 - Biesolo (Giesolo de Lou, Oiseau de Feux)
- 2 - Quick Pay (Atas Fighter L., Born Quick)
- 2 - Texas (Grades Singing, Copiad)
- 2 - Super Bowl (Davidia Hanover, Napoletano)

=== Countries, number of wins ===
- 11 - France
- 10 - United States
- 9 - Sweden
- 4 - Finland
- 1 - Italy

=== All winners of Finlandia-Ajo ===
Year	Horse	Driver	Trainer	Winning horse's native country	Winning time
2019	Readly Express	Björn Goop	Timo Nurmos	Sweden	1:10:5
2018	Pastore Bob	Johan Untersteiner	Johan Untersteiner	Sweden	1:11:0
2017	D.D.'s Hitman	Ulf Ohlsson	Petri Puro	Finland	1:09:8
2016	Propulsion	Örjan Kihlströn	Daniel Reden	Sweden	1:10:2
2015	Bret Boko	Ari Moilanen	Markku Nieminen	Finland	1:12.2
2014	Univers de Pan	Philippe Daugeard	Philippe Daugeard	France	1:10.7
2013	Nesta Effe	Roberto Vecchione	Holger Ehlert	Italy	1:10.9
2012	Sebastian K	Björn Goop	Lutfi Kolgjini	Sweden	1:11.1
2011	Commander Crowe	Jean-Michel Bazire	Fabrice Souloy	Sweden	1:13.7
2010	Quarcio du Chene	Björn Goop	Olle Goop	France	1:10.6
2009	Igor Font	Jean-Michel Bazire	Fabrice Souloy	France	1:11.8
2008	Oiseau de Feux	Jean-Michel Bazire	Fabrice Souloy	France	1:11.3
2007	Opal Viking	Jorma Kontio	Nils Enqvist	Sweden	1:10.8
2006	Hot Shot Knick	Thomas Uhrberg	Kari Lähdekorpi	Sweden	1:11.5
2005	Kart de Baudrairie	Jean-Michel Bazire	Franck Leblanc	France	1:12.2
2004	Rotation	Stig H. Johansson	Stig H. Johansson	United States	1:12.5
2003	Kiwi	Joseph Verbeeck	Fabrice Souloy	France	1:12.0
2002	H.P. Paque	Trond Smedshammer	Trond Smedshammer	United States	1:11.7
2001	B.W.T. Magic	Ahti Antti-Roiko	Matti Salmi	Finland	1:11.2
2000	Giesolo de Lou	Jean-Etienne Dubois	Jean-Etienne Dubois	France	1:11.2
1999	Giesolo de Lou	Pierre Vercruysse	Jean-Etienne Dubois	France	1:11.6
1998	Dryade des Bois	Joseph Verbeeck	Jean-Baptiste Bossuet	France	1:12.5
1997	Zoogin	Åke Svanstedt	Åke Svanstedt	Sweden	1:12.1
1996	Isla J. Brave	Aki Antti-Roiko	Petri Klemola	Finland	1:12.5
1995	SJ's Photo	David Wade	David Wade	United States	1:13.3
1994	Copiad	Erik Berglöf	Erik Berglöf	Sweden	1:12.5
1993	Born Quick	Tommy Hanné	Tommy Hanné	Finland	1:12.1
1992	Otto-Mani	Antti Teivainen	Esa Aronen	Finland	1:13.7
1991	Atas Fighter L.	Torbjörn Jansson	Torbjörn Jansson	Sweden	1:13.5
1990	Florida Jewel	William Fahy	John Holloway	United States	1:13.3
1989	Napoletano	Stig H. Johansson	Stig Engberg	United States	1:12.9
1988	Napoletano	Stig H. Johansson	Stig Engberg	United States	1:14.1
1987	Grades Singing	Olle Goop	Olle Goop	United States	1:14.1
1986	Davidia Hanover	Jorma Kontio	Per Eriksson	United States	1:14.7
1985	Keystone Patton	Jorma Kontio	Antti Savolainen	United States	1:14.1
1984	Shane T. Hanover	Per Henriksen	Per Henriksen	United States	1:14.9
1983	Speedy Magnus	Olle Goop	Olle Goop	Sweden	1:13.2
1982	Dartster F.	Olle Hedin	Olle Hedin	Sweden	1:13.9
1981	Ideal du Gazeau	Eugene Lefevre	Eugene Lefevre	France	1:14.3
1980	Ejakval	Jean-Claude David	Jean-Claude David	France	1:15.6

== See also ==
- List of Scandinavian harness horse races
