= Vermo =

Horse racing venue in Espoo, Finland

Coordinates: 60°12′59″N 24°50′23″E

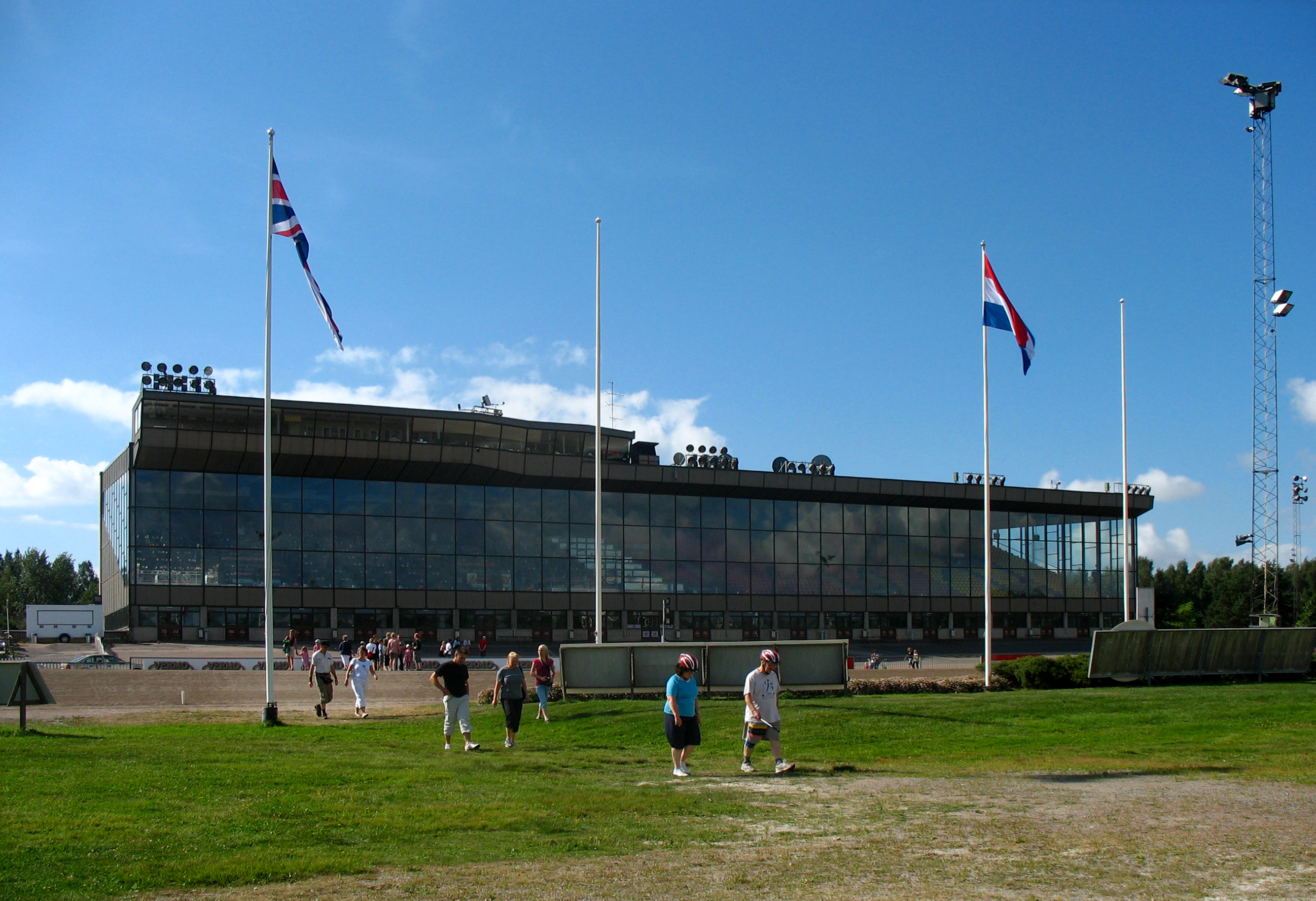

Vermo (in Finnish: Vermon ravirata) is the largest harness racing track in Finland. The track opened in 1977. It is located in the Leppävaara district of Espoo, but it is officially regarded as the racecourse of the neighbouring city Helsinki. The length of the track is 1000 metres and width 24–26 metres. A notable race is Finlandia-Ajo.

In 2023, it was disclosed that the racetrack received over 6 million euros in Finnish government subsidies the previous year. From 2020 to 2022, the track was subsidized by 18 million in public subsidies.

In 2024, the city of Helsinki proposed plans to turn the racetrack into a dense residential area.
