= New Zealand harness Horse of the Year =

New Zealand horse racing award

The New Zealand harness Horse of the Year is awarded to the horse who is voted to be the best performed standardbred horse during the New Zealand racing season. This award is open to all harness horses racing within New Zealand, regardless of age and sex, and includes overseas performances.

== Background ==
There are two main horse racing codes in New Zealand:

- standardbred or harness racing, in which the horses are driven by a person sitting behind the horse in a lightweight cart called a sulky, and
- thoroughbred racing in which the horses are ridden by a jockey. For these horses, also known as gallopers, there is a New Zealand Thoroughbred Horse of the Year award.

== Horses of the Year ==
The following standardbred or harness horses have been awarded the title.

Year	Horse	Age/sex	Breeding	Trainer(s)
2025	Republican Party	7yo h	Bettor's Delight - Democrat Party	Cran & Chrissie Dalgety
2024	Just Believe	8yo g	Orlando Vici - Heavens Above	Jess Tubbs, Victoria
2022-23	Milwood Nike	3yo f	Captaintreacherous - Albuquerque	Mark & Nathan Purdon
2021-22	Sundees Son	7yo g	Majestic Sun - Stardon	Robert Dunn
2020-21	Sundees Son	6yo g	Majestic Son - Stardon	Robert Dunn
2019-20	Ultimate Sniper	4yo h	Bettor's Delight - Reality Check	Mark Purdon & Natalie Rasmussen
2018-19	Spankem	4yo m	Bettor's Delight - Crushem	Mark Purdon & Natalie Rasmussen
2017/18	Lazarus	5yo h	Bettor's Delight - Bethany	Mark Purdon & Natalie Rasmussen
2016/17	Lazarus	4yo h	Bettor's Delight - Bethany	Mark Purdon & Natalie Rasmussen
2015/16	Monbet	4yo g	Love You - Diedre Darling	Greg P & Mrs Nina M Hope
2014/15	Christen Me	6yo g	Christian Cullen - Splendid Dreams	Cran T Dalgety
2013/14	Terror to Love	6yo h	Western Terror - Love To Live	Graham T Court & Paul T Court
2012/13	Terror to Love	5yo h	Western Terror - Love To Live	Graham T Court & Paul T Court
2011/12	I Can Doosit	6yo g	Muscles Yankee - Sheezadoosie	Mark Purdon & Grant R Payne
2010/11	Carabella	3yo m	Bettor's Delight - Andress Blue Chip	Brendon R Hill
2009/10	Monkey King	7yo g	Sands A Flyin - Tuapeka Vale	Brendon R Hill
2008/09	Auckland Reactor	5yo h	Mach Three - Atomic Lass	Mark Purdon & Greg R Payne
2007/08	Auckland Reactor	4yo h	Mach Three - Atomic Lass	Mark Purdon & Greg R Payne
2006/07	Flashing Red	9yo h	Echelon (USA) - Courvy Kazi (AUS)	Tim Butt & Phil Anderson
2005/06	Mainland Banner	4yo m	Christian Cullen - Corporate Banner	Robert J Dunn
2004/05	Elsu	5yo h	Falcon Seelster (USA) - Interchange (NZ)	Geoff C Small
2003/04	Elsu	4yo h	Falcon Seelster (USA) - Interchange (NZ)	Geoff C Small
2002/03	Take A Moment	7yo g	Armbro Invasion (NZ) - Nakura (NZ)	Tim G Butt
2001/02	Elect To Live	3yo m	Live Or Die - Lopez Elect	Neil Brady
2000/01	Yulestar	6yo g	Cameleon - Victoria Star	Tony F Shaw
1999/2000	Lyell Creek	6yo g	Roydon Glen (NZ) - Kahlum (NZ)	Tim G Butt
1998/99	Christian Cullen	4yo h	In The Pocket (US) - Pleasant Franco	Brian A O'Meara
1997/98	Merinai	6yo m	Tuff Choice (USA) - Meriden	N Ross Baker, John F Bedwell
1996/97	Iraklis	4yo h	Vance Hanover (USA) - Tuapeka Star	Robert Cameron
1995/96	Il Vicolo	4yo h	Vance Hanover (USA)) - Burgundy Lass (NZ)	Roy C & Barry Purdon, Clevedon
1994/95	Il Vicolo	3yo c	Vance Hanover (USA) - Burgundy Lass (NZ)	Roy C & Barry Purdon, Clevedon
1993/94	Chokin	5yo g	Vance Hanover (USA) - Nell's Pride (NZ)	Roy C & Barry Purdon, Clevedon
1992/93	Blossom Lady	8yo m	Farm Timer - Lumber Lady	Derek Jones, Templeton
1991/92	Christopher Vance	5yo g	Vance Hanover (USA) - Disco Girl	Roy C & Barry Purdon, Clevedon
1990/91	Chokin	2yo c	Vance Hanover (USA) - Neil's Pride (NZ)	Brian Hughes, Pukukohe
1989/90	Inky Lord	4yo h	Lordship - Miss Bromac	Brian V Saunders, Methven
1988/89	Luxury Liner	7yo g	Mercedes - Miranda Belle	Roy C & Barry Purdon, Clevedon
1987/88	Luxury Liner	6yo g	Mercedes - Miranda Belle	Roy C & Barry Purdon, Clevedon
1986/87	Master Mood	5yo h	Noodlum - Moods	Kevin L Williams, Weedons
1985/86	Master Mood	4yo h	Noodlum - Moods	Kevin L Williams, Weedons
1984/85	Roydon Glen	4yo h	Smooth Fella - Roydon Dream	W F Fletcher, Templeton
1983/84	Sir Castleton	7yo g	Game Pride - Castleton's Queen	M S MacPherson, Willowmere
1982/83	Bonnie's Chance	7yo m	Majestic Chance (USA) - Bonnie Countess	Richard J Brosnan, Kerrytown
1981/82	Armalight	5yo m	Timely Knight - Ar Miss	H B Smith, Weedons
1980/81	Delightful Lady	7yo m	Tudor Hanover (USA) - Desilu (NZ)	M J Stormont, Pukekohe
1979/80	Lord Module	5yo h	Lordship - Module (NZ)	C C Devine, Templeton
1978/79	No Response	7yo g	Hodgen's Surprise (USA) - Cordsworth	R J Brosnan, Kerrytown
1977/78	Sole Command	6yo g	Scottish Command (NZ) - Single Charm	Roy C & Barry Purdon
1976/77	Stanley Rio	4yo h	Nevele Golfer (USA) - Rio Fleur (AUST)	George Bennett Noble
1975/76	Lunar Chance	5yo g	Majestic Chance (USA) - Irish Idyll	Keith Nicholas Lawlor
1974/75	Young Quinn	5yo h	Young Charles (NZ) - Loyal Trick (NZ)	Charlie S Hunter ONZM
1973/74	Robalan	6yo g	Lumber Dream (NZ) - Elsinore (NZ)	Denis D Nyhan, Templeton
1972/73	Wag	5yo g	Thurber Frost (USA) - Merval	W E Lowe, Ashburton
1971/72	Arapaho	4yo g	Bachelor Hanover (USA) - Dusky Bay	Jack Smolenski, Templeton
1970/71	Stella Frost	6yo m	Thurber Frost (USA) - Stella Grattan	Doody Townley
1969/70	Bonnie Frost	3yo m	Thurber Frost (USA) - Bonnie Widow	George Bennett Noble
1968/69	Garcon Roux	3yo g	Thurber Frost (USA) - La Mignon	George Bennett Noble

== See also ==
- Harness racing in New Zealand
- New Zealand Trotting Hall of Fame
- Thoroughbred racing in New Zealand
- New Zealand Racing Hall of Fame
