= New Zealand Sires Stakes 3yo Final =

- Class: Group I
- Location: Addington, New Zealand; Christchurch, New Zealand
- Inaugurated: 1984
- Race type: Standardbred - Flat racing
- Website: www.addington.co.nz

Race information
- Distance: 1980m (2018-)
- Surface: Dirt
- Track: Left-handed oval
- Qualification: Three-year-old horses
- Purse: NZ$200,000 (2025)

The New Zealand Sires Stakes 3yo Final is an event for 3-year-old pacing horses in New Zealand. The race is one of the major harness races in New Zealand and is contested by the top three-year-old horses, who have to qualify in heats run throughout New Zealand in the preceding six weeks.

Until 2021 it was run on the same day as the New Zealand Trotting Cup. After no race in 2022, the 2023 event was moved to May.

== Records ==
Most wins by a driver:

- 6 - Mark Purdon (1994, 2001, 2007, 2015, 2020, 2021)
- 6 - Natalie Rasmussen (2016, 2017, 2018, 2019, 2023, 2024)
- 3 - Anthony Butt (1995, 2004, 2008)
- 3 - Tony Herlihy (1991, 2002, 2006)
- 3 - Maurice McKendry (1987, 1993, 2009)

== Winners list ==
The following are winners of the race.

Year	Horse	Owner	Driver	Time
2025	Marketplace	Mrs G J Kennard, P I Kennard, P I Baken, Small Car World Ltd, R J Magness, R W Todd	Craig Ferguson	2:21.2 (1980m)
2024	Chase A Dream	Studholme Bloodstock Limited, Mrs C A Gimblett, Mrs G Borlase, Miss K M Gimblett	Natalie Rasmussen	2:22.7 (1980m)
2023	Don’t Stop Dreaming	Ian Dobson, Dennis Dunford, Mark Dunford	Natalie Rasmussen	2:19.8 (1980m)
2022	No race			
2021	Franco Indie	Alabar (NZ) Ltd, Nevele R Stud Ltd et al	Mark Purdon	2:20.2 (1980m)
2020	It's All About Faith	Dennis Dunford, Mark Dunford	Mark Purdon	2:21.9 (1980m)
2019	One Change	All Stars Racing Stables Limited, M R Woodlock, T G Casey	Natalie Rasmussen	2:21.9 (1980m)
2018	Ultimate Sniper	Mrs G J Kennard, P I Kennard, G R Douglas, P J Creighton, Mrs M C Creighton, K J Riseley	Natalie Rasmussen	2:19.0 (1980m)
2017	Chase Auckland	Alabar Racing Syndicate	Natalie Rasmussen	2:16.1 (1950m)
2016	Ultimate Machete	Mrs G J Kennard, P I Kennard, G R Douglas, K J Riseley, P J Creighton, Mrs M C Creighton	Natalie Rasmussen	2:16.5 (1950m)
2015	Lazarus	Mrs G J Kennard, P I Kennard, T G Casey, K J Riseley	Mark Purdon	2:19.2 (1950m)
2014	Have Faith in Me	Dennis Dunford, Mark Dunford	Tim Willams	2:17.3 (1950m)
2013	Tiger Tara	R L and Mrs J A Sandford, J S Gould, G R Dunn	Gerard O'Relly	2:19.7 (1950m)
2012	Franco Nelson	Spreydon Lodge Ltd, Ms Sharon McKay, Rona McKay, Clive McKay	Craig Thornley	2:20.7 (1950m)
2011	Texican	A J Wakefield, Dr S M Wakefield	Dexter Dunn	2:20.6 (1950m)
2010	Gold Ace	Ms W A Reid, D G Moore, M Ng, D D Syndicate	Peter Ferguson	2:22.0 (1950m)
2009	Sir Lincoln	Lincoln Farms Ltd	Maurice McKendry	2:19.7 (1950m)
2008	Stunin Cullen	T McDonald, E C Griffin	Anthony Butt	2:18.3 (1950m)
2007	Auckland Reactor	A J Parker, Mrs P R A Parker	Mark Purdon	2:21.9 (1950m)
2006	Fergiemack	The Royalmarie Breeding Syndicate	Tony Herlihy	2:20.4 (1950m)
2005	Pay Me Christian	M C Paget, P F Mahoney, M P Boyce, G P Dwyer, B D Rose, T M McCormick	David Butt	2:21.9 (1950m)
2004	Tribute	Joan and Peter Cocks	Anthony Butt	2:20.6
2003	Roman Gladiator	Mrs A D Swain, Mrs M Neil	Colin De Filippi	2:20.4 (1950m)
2002	Maheer Lord	R M Baker, J A MacKinnon	Tony Herlihy	2:23.8 (1950m)
2001	Jack Cade	J H Seaton, Mark Purdon	Mark Purdon	2:24.0 (1950m)
2000	Franco Heir	Dalcom Corporation Pty Ltd	John Hay	2:22.4 (1950m)
1999	Stars And Stripes	C N Radford, Mrs J Z Radford	Ken Barron	2:22.8 (1950m)
1998	Courage Under Fire	G W Brodie	Colin De Filippi	2:22.9 (1950m)
1997	Christian Cullen	I D Dobson, Mrs D A Dobson, B A O'Meara	Ricky May	2:27.5 (2000m)
1996	Franco Enforce	W J Francis	John Hay	2:26.1 (2000m)
1995	Spirit of Zeus	M R & B G Marlow, Brian O'Meara, I D Dobson	Anthony Butt	2:26.5 (2000m)
1994	Il Vicolo	J H Seaton, Mark Purdon	Mark Purdon	2:27.9 (2000m)
1993	Motoring Magic	C Hadley, G Haworth, Mrs D Hadley	Maurice McKendry	2:27.5 (2000m)
1992	Laud	G G Helleur, A A Helleur	Peter Jones	2:30.1 (2000m)
1991	Chokin	Pacers Australia Synd	Tony Herlihy	2:27.3 (2000m)
1990	Talk About Swift	C W McLachlan	Robert Cameron	1:59.5 (1609m)
1989	Honkin Vision	V L Devery, Mrs D L Devery	Henry Skinner	1:57.4 (1609m)
1988	National Glory	K & Mrs J McDonald, R & Mrs R Dunn	Robert Dunn	1:57.7 (1609m)
1987	Dillon Dean	K Burley, D Dwyer	Maurice McKendry	1:58.6 (1609m)
1986	Megatrend	E N Crawford, A A Kennett	Jack Carmichael	1:58.9 (1609m)
1985	Sir Alba	R D Teahen, D P Teahen	Richard Brosnan	1:57.4 (1609m)
1984	Arveeae	V L, R J & A T Devery	Henry Skinner	1:59.1 (1609m)

== Other major races ==
- Auckland Trotting Cup
- New Zealand Trotting Cup
- Great Northern Derby
- Rowe Cup
- Dominion Handicap
- Noel J Taylor Mile
- Inter Dominion Pacing Championship
- Inter Dominion Trotting Championship
- Miracle Mile Pace

== See also ==
- Harness racing
- Harness racing in New Zealand
