= Ricky May (harness racing) =

New Zealand standardbred racehorse driver

Richard Terence May, known as Ricky May, is a New Zealand harness racing driver. He is notable for winning the New Zealand Trotting Cup seven times and one of only three drivers to have over 3000 New Zealand winners.

== Background ==
Ricky's grandfather Clarrie May was a blacksmith at Methven and trained and drove Loyal Nurse to win the 1946 Auckland Trotting Cup.

Ricky's father Terry May was also a horse trainer and driver. He was notable for training and driving the well performed pacer Palestine in the late 1970s who won the Hannon Memorial twice, Kaikoura Cup and Alan Matson Free For All.

== Racing career ==
Ricky commenced as a junior driver in the 1976/77 season and his first win was on 27 November 1976 at Orari, with his grandmother's horse Ruling River, that was trained by his father.

In February 1997 he drove his 1000th winner. In that year he also placed 4th in the World drivers championship in Germany.

In the 2003/04 season May won the New Zealand drivers premiership with 105 winners for the season. That was his only premiership win although he did manage to beat that total with 115 wins in the 2013 season.

In the 2007/08 season May became the third New Zealand harness driver to achieve 2000 wins, joining Tony Herlihy and Maurice McKendry.

In 2013 he was inducted into the Addington Harness Hall of Fame.

On 2 January 2020 May was driving A G's White Socks in the Central Otago Cup at the Omakau meeting. He collapsed and slumped in the sulky while the horse headed down the straight. A fellow driver Ellie Barron, a qualified physiotherapist, performed CPR on May and doctors came from the crowd to assist before he was taken to Dunedin hospital by the Otago Regional Rescue Helicopter. He was told his heart had stopped and he had died for 10 minutes. The official diagnosis was hypertrophic obstructive cardiomyopathy, a sometimes genetic condition where heart muscles thicken, making it hard for the heart to operate. He had surgery to have a cardioverter defibrillator implanted in his chest.

May had a good recovery and was back driving horses at race meetings about six months later. In July 2021 he went on to pass 3000 winning drives when he drove Sheeza Artist to win at Addington Raceway, becoming the third to reach the total after Tony Herlihy and Maurice McKendry. He also holds the record for driving more races in New Zealand than anyone else.

Ricky and his wife Judy have a farm in Methven and have adult children.

== Notable wins ==
The following are some of the major races Ricky has won.

| Year | Race | Horse | Trainer(s) |
|---|---|---|---|
| 1982 Oct | Ashburton Flying Stakes | Vita Man | Alistair Malcolmson |
| 1987 Sep | Ashburton Flying Stakes (2) | Happy Sunrise | Brian Saunders |
| 1988 May | Rowe Cup | Highwood | Warren Stapleton |
| 1989 Apr | Northern Derby | Inky Lord | Brian Saunders |
| 1989 Oct | Hannon Memorial | Inky Lord | Brian Saunders |
| 1989 Nov | New Zealand Trotting Cup | Inky Lord | Brian Saunders |
| 1990 Apr | Easter Cup | Inky Lord | Brian Saunders |
| 1990 Dec | Invercargill Cup | Field Commander | Brian Saunders |
| 1992 Sep | Methven Cup | Kirchdorf | Ron Fraser |
| 1996 Nov | New Zealand Free For All | Iraklis | Robert Cameron |
| 1996 Nov | Monsanto Mile Free For All (Renwick FFA) | New Age Man | Laurence Hanrahan |
| 1996 Dec | Miracle Mile Pace | Iraklis | Robert Cameron |
| 1997 Feb | Victoria Derby | Lavros Star | Robert Cameron |
| 1997 Sep | Hannon Memorial (2) | Iraklis | Robert Cameron |
| 1997 Oct | Ashburton Flying Stakes (3) | Iraklis | Robert Cameron |
| 1997 Nov | New Zealand Trotting Cup (2) | Iraklis | Robert Cameron |
| 1997 Nov | New Zealand Sires Stakes Final (G1) | Christian Cullen | Brian O'Meara |
| 1998 Sep | Hannon Memorial (3) | Iraklis | Robert Cameron |
| 1998 Nov | Dominion Handicap | Cedar Fella | Warren Stapleton |
| 2001 Oct | Ashburton Flying Stakes (4) | Panky's Pacer | Robert Dunn |
| 2002 Sep | Hannon Memorial (4) | Panky's Pacer | Robert Dunn |
| 2004 Apr | Easter Cup (2) | Blue Chip Rock | Joe Hill |
| 2005 Nov | New Zealand Trotting Cup (3) | Mainland Banner | Robert Dunn |
| 2005 May | New Zealand Oaks | Mainland Banner | Robert Dunn |
| 2005 Dec | Australian Trotting Grand Prix (G1) | Allegro Agitato | Phil Williamson |
| 2006 Feb | New Zealand Breeders Stakes (G1, F & M) | Mainland Banner | Robert Dunn |
| 2006 Mar | New Zealand Trotting Championship | Allegro Agitato | Phil Williamson |
| 2006 Apr | Easter Cup (3) | Baileys Dream | Steven Reid |
| 2006 Apr | Noel Taylor Mile | Mainland Banner | Robert Dunn |
| 2006 May | New Zealand Messenger | Mainland Banner | Robert Dunn |
| 2006 Dec | Lyell Creek Stakes | Allegro Agitato | Phil Williamson |
| 2006 Dec | National Trot | Allegro Agitato | Phil Williamson |
| 2007 Sep | Hannon Memorial (5) | Baileys Dream | Steven Reid |
| 2007 Oct | Methven Cup (2) | Baileys Dream | Steven Reid |
| 2008 Mar | Easter Cup (4) | Monkey King | Steven Reid |
| 2009 Apr | Easter Cup (5) | Monkey King | Brendon Hill |
| 2009 Mar | Invercargill Cup (2) | Mr Molly | Ben Waldron |
| 2009 Oct | Renwick Free For All (2) | Monkey King | Brendon Hill |
| 2009 Nov | New Zealand Trotting Cup (4) | Monkey King | Brendon Hill |
| 2009 Nov | New Zealand Free For All (2) | Monkey King | Brendon Hill |
| 2009 Nov | Miracle Mile Pace (2) | Monkey King | Brendon Hill |
| 2010 Mar | Auckland Trotting Cup | Monkey King | Brendon Hill |
| 2010 Nov | New Zealand Trotting Cup (5) | Monkey King | Brendon Hill |
| 2010 Nov | New Zealand Free For All (3) | Monkey King | Brendon Hill |
| 2010 Nov | Dominion Handicap (2) | Stylish Monarch | Murray Tapper |
| 2011 Sep | Hannon Memorial (6) | Monkey King | Brendon Hill |
| 2012 Oct | Ashburton Flying Stakes (5) | Terror to Love | Graham & Paul Court |
| 2012 Nov | New Zealand Trotting Cup (6) | Terror to Love | Graham & Paul Court |
| 2013 Mar | Easter Cup (6) | Terror to Love | Graham & Paul Court |
| 2013 Oct | Ashburton Flying Stakes (6) | Terror to Love | Graham & Paul Court |
| 2013 Nov | New Zealand Trotting Cup (7) | Terror to Love | Graham & Paul Court |
| 2014 May | Auckland Trotting Cup (2) | Terror to Love | Graham & Paul Court |
| 2014 Dec | Cranbourne Cup | Terror to Love | Graham & Paul Court |
| 2015 Dec | Lyell Creek Stakes (2) | Monbet | Greg & Nina Hope |
| 2015 Dec | National Trot (2) | Monbet | Greg & Nina Hope |
| 2016 Jan | Australasian Trotting Championship, Melton | Monbet | Greg & Nina Hope |
| 2016 Apr | Rowe Cup (2) | Monbet | Greg & Nina Hope |
| 2016 Nov | Dominion Handicap (3) | Monbet | Greg & Nina Hope |
| 2016 Dec | National Trot (3) | Quite A Moment | Greg & Nina Hope |
| 2018 Mar | Easter Cup (7) | A G's White Socks | Greg & Nina Hope |
| 2018 Apr | Noel Taylor Mile (2) | A G's White Socks | Greg & Nina Hope |

== Inter Dominions ==
In March 1997 Ricky drove Iraklis in the Inter Dominion at Globe Derby winning a heat and placing second in two others to Quantum Lobell and Our Sir Vancelot respectively. They then finished 3rd in the grand final behind Our Sir Vancelot and Rainbow Knight.

In February/March 2010 Ricky drove Monkey King in the Inter Dominion at Harold Park and Newcastle, Sydney. Ricky drove Monkey King to wins in his two heats and was placed second in the grand final behind Blacks A Fake with Smoken Up 3rd and Changeover 4th.

In March 2013 Ricky drove Terror to Love in the Inter Dominion grand final placing 4th behind Im Themightyquinn, Mah Sish and Excel Stride.

== See also ==
- Harness racing in New Zealand
