= Lawn Derby =

Australian Standardbred racehorse

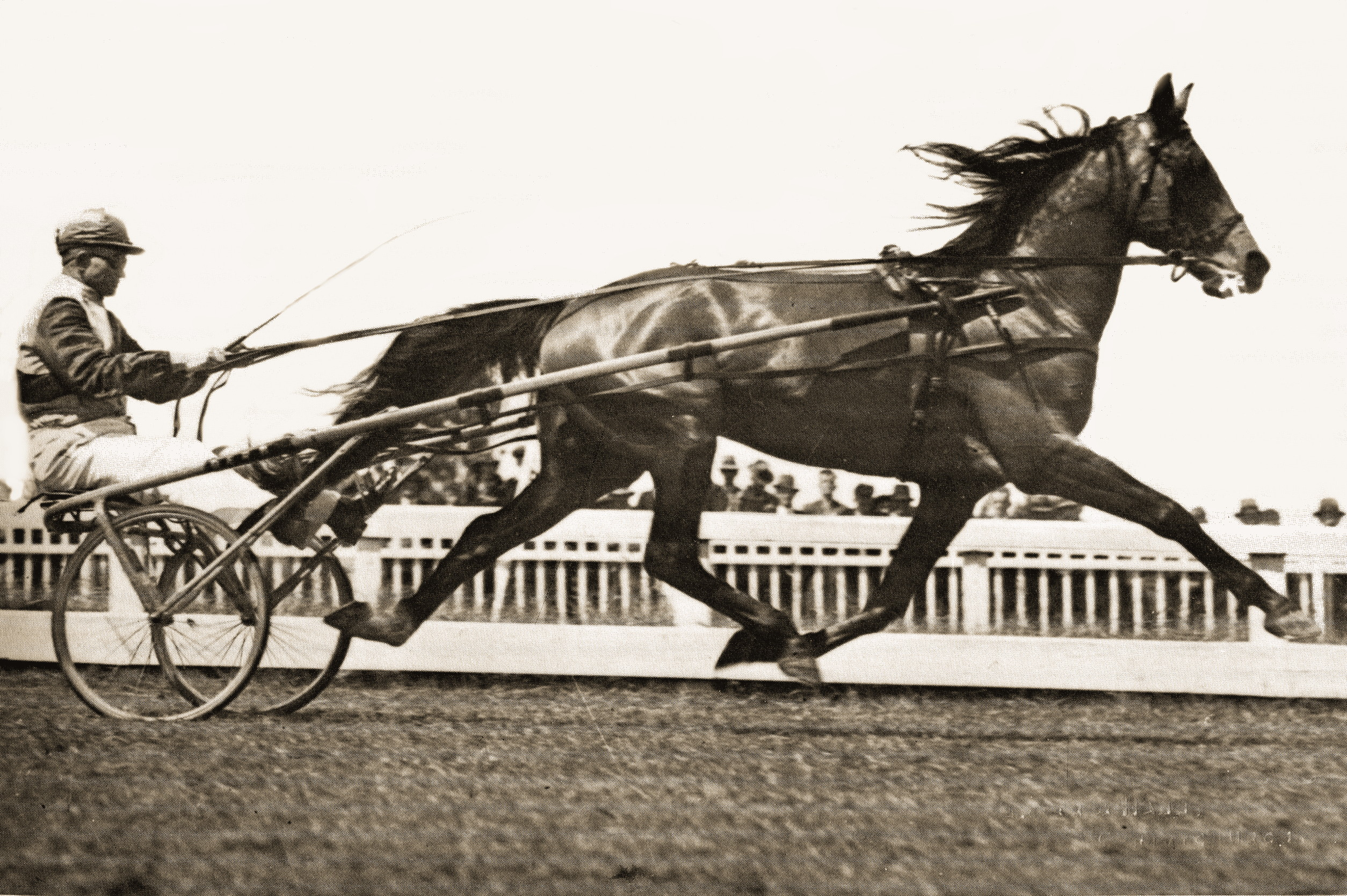
- Breed: Standardbred
- Sire: Robert Derby
- Grandsire: Globe Derby
- Dam: Roselawn
- Damsire: Childewood
- Sex: Stallion
- Foaled: 1930
- Died: 7 November 1954
- Country: Australia
- Colour: Bay
- Breeder: J F Mackenny
- Owner: J F Mackenny
- Trainer: W J O'Shea

Major wins
- New South Wales Pacers Derby (1934); Easter Cup (1937); Ascot Pacers Cup (1937); Ascot 500 (1937); Presidents Handicap (1937)

Honours
- First pacer to pace a mile under 2:00 outside North America; New Zealand Mile Record; Australian Mile Record
- Last updated on 2016-03-05

Lawn Derby is an Australian Standardbred racehorse who became the first pacer to pace a mile in under two minutes outside of North America at Addington, New Zealand, in 1938. He also set records in Australia.

== Background ==
Lawn Derby was bred at Cowra, New South Wales and was a foal of 1930 by Robert Derby a son of Globe Derby.

== Racing career ==
Lawn Derby won the New South Wales Pacers Derby in 1934 but there was drama after the race when the horse was unwell and it appeared that he may have been doped.

Lawn Derby travelled to Tasmania for Easter racing in 1935, but did not figure in the finish of the Easter Cup. He began serving mares in 1935 and as a result was not able to travel to Perth for the first running of the Inter Dominion at Gloucester Park. At the Sydney Showgrounds in 1936 Lawn Derby recorded a time of 2:03 1/5 in a time trial, the second fastest recorded in Australia at the time behind only Walla Walla. In 1937 Lawn Derby contested the Inter Dominion at Wayville Showgrounds, Adelaide. Lawn Derby won on the first night of the Championships and later "won" a heat on the second night but the race was found to have been run a lap short and was re-run with Lawn Derby out of the placings. In the final he was a close fourth behind Dan's Son and a week later in a time trial he recorded a mile in 2:05 which was the fastest time recorded in the state of South Australia. Lawn Derby travelled to Tasmania for the Easter racing and won the Easter Cup from an 84 yards handicap and was second in the Easter Plate from 148 yards behind. He then won the Northall Champion Stakes in Hobart from a 108 yards handicap.

In Melbourne in the spring of 1937 Lawn Derby won the Ascot Pacers Cup from 96 yards behind in course record time, broke the Melbourne Showgrounds track record by more than four seconds with a 2:03 3/5 time trial and then won the Ascot 500 from 120 yards behind in an Australian record mile rate of 2.08 2/3 for 1 ½ miles. Taken to New Zealand Lawn Derby broke stride after suffering interference in the Auckland Trotting Cup but he then won the Presidents Handicap beating New Zealand Trotting Cup winner Lucky Jack with Indianapolis among the unplaced horses. Back in Australia he won the Championship Trial at Ascot and recorded a 2.02 4/5 mile in a time trial at Harold Park was which only two fifths of a second slower than Walla Walla's Australian record. At the Brisbane show Lawn Derby lowered a long-standing record with a 2:09 ½ mile against time. In Melbourne he finished fourth from a 120 yards handicap in the Ascot Pacers Cup and won a free-for-all at the Melbourne Show defeating 1936 Inter Dominion Final winner Logan Derby Lawn Derby then made an historic trip to New Zealand.

At Addington, Christchurch he found a handicap of 60 yards too much when unplaced in the New Zealand Trotting Cup but on November 11, 1938 Lawn Derby became the first pacer outside of North America to run a mile in under two minutes with a 1:59 2/5 time trial. The previous record for Australia or New Zealand of 2:00 2/5 was held by Indianapolis. In December Lawn Derby paced a mile in 2:03 at New Brighton which was a record for a grass track. In a match race in Auckland Lawn Derby was defeated by his three quarter brother Van Derby. Van Derby covered the mile in 2:01 1/5 which was the fastest grass track mile recorded in New Zealand.

After a long spell Lawn Derby won a heat and finished third in the final of the Free-For-All at the Melbourne Showgrounds behind Springfield Globe and Logan Derby and against time, also at the Showgrounds, he could only manage 2:07. He was taken to New Zealand but he took almost no part in the New Zealand Trotting Cup after standing on the mark and failed to make much ground in the latter stages after a slow start on the second day of the meeting at Addington and again in the New Zealand Free For All on third day. In December 1939, Lawn Derby defeated dual New Zealand Trotting Cup winner Lucky Jack in a match race at Addington in the fast time of 2:01 and recorded a track record of 2:02 2/5 against time at Claudelands.

In February 1940 Lawn Derby established a new Australian mile record at Harold Park. He paced a mile in 2:02 breaking the previous record of Walla Walla. Then at Snowtown, South Australia he recorded a mile of 2:02 ½ in windy conditions which was a state record breaking his own record set at Wayville in 1937. While still in South Australia he finished sixth in the South Australian Trotting Cup from a 60 yards handicap.

Lawn Derby won about 31 races however records from the time are incomplete. He set records in five states and in New Zealand.

== Stud record ==
While still racing Lawn Derby had already began his stud career and he stood at Cowra between 1935 and 1953. His progeny include Avian Derby winner of the 1952 Inter Dominion, Ribands the winner of the 1954 A G Hunter Cup, Belgrave, Johnnie Lawn, Miss Lawnham and Peak Hill who were all winners of the New South Wales Pacers Derby, and Claude Derby and Set Point who both were winners of Inter Dominion heats. In his only public stud season Peak Hill sires Silver Peak a winner of both the New South Wales Pacers Derby and A G Hunter Cup. He died at Cowra in November 1954. The annual Australian Harness Racing Awards are named in his honour.
