= Cecil Devine =

New Zealand harness racing driver

Cecil Charles Devine (23 March 1915 – 4 July 1990) was a driver of standardbred racehorses in New Zealand. He drove many winners of major races in New Zealand. His greatest achievement was winning the New Zealand Trotting Cup, New Zealand's premier racing event, three times in a row in 1958, 1959 and 1960 with False Step. He also drove False Step in the US International Paces at Yonkers and Roosevelt.

Throughout his career, Devine was one of the "old school" who referred to the sport as "trotting" rather than the more fashionable name of "harness racing". He first got into the sport in the depression years, saying that he otherwise might have ended up a lawyer. He was associated with many top horses. He won the New Zealand Trotting Cup with Lord Module, which he also owned. He won a record six New Zealand Trotting Cups in all with Lord Module, Thunder, and Van Dieman, and with False Step three times.

False Step went on to beat the acknowledged American champion of the time, Adios Butler, in the United States.

He also won:

- 1960 New Zealand Free For All with False Step
- 1965 New Zealand Trotting Derby with Bass Strait
- 1979 New Zealand Free For All with Lord Module

== See also ==
- Harness racing in New Zealand
