= False Step =

New Zealand Standardbred racehorse

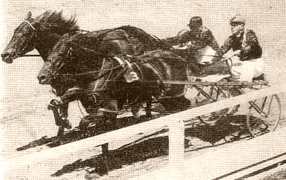
- False Step (inner) defeats Glint in the 1955 NZ Derby Stakes.
- Breed: Standardbred
- Sire: Fallacy (NZ)
- Grandsire: Light Brigade (USA)
- Dam: Dainty Direct (NZ)
- Maternal grandsire: Dan Direct Eu (UK)
- Sex: Stallion
- Foaled: 1 September 1952
- Country: New Zealand
- Colour: Bay
- Owner: J Smyth
- Trainer: C C Devine

Earnings
- $188,542

Major wins
- 1955 New Zealand Trotting Derby; 1958, 1959 & 1960 New Zealand Trotting Cup
- Last updated on: 24 October 2011.

False Step was a New Zealand Standardbred racehorse. He is notable in that he won three New Zealand Trotting Cup races, the richest harness horse race in New Zealand. False Step is one of three horses to win the NZ Trotting Cup three times, the others being Indianapolis and Terror to Love.

False Step was also taken to the United States in 1960 by his trainer and reinsman Cecil Devine, who had driven him to victory three times in the New Zealand Cup. The horse scored success in the International Series at Yonkers Raceway, and also defeated the acknowledged American champion of the time, Adios Butler.

== Major races ==
He won the following major races:

- 1955 New Zealand Trotting Derby
- 1958 New Zealand Trotting Cup
- 1959 New Zealand Trotting Cup (handicapped 24 yards)
- 1960 New Zealand Trotting Cup (handicapped 48 yards)

== See also ==
- Harness racing in New Zealand
