= Changeover (horse) =

New Zealand Standardbred racehorse

- Breed: Standardbred
- Sire: In The Pocket (USA)
- Grandsire: Direct Scooter
- Dam: Chaangerr
- Maternal grandsire: Vance Hanover
- Sex: Stallion
- Foaled: 4 December 2003 (age 21)
- Country: New Zealand
- Trainer: Geoff Small
- Last updated on: 22 May 2022.

Changeover is a New Zealand Standardbred racehorse and stud stallion.

He was bred by Robert Carr and Don Kirkbride. He was purchased and owned by the Auckland Trotting Club Trot 2006 Syndicate.

== Racing career ==
He was at one time New Zealand's second highest earning pacer ever with over $2.4 million. He is most noted for winning the New Zealand Trotting Cup in 2008, when he posted a then race record time of 3:56.4 for the 3200m. He won the Cup by almost 2 lengths from Baileys Dream and Report For Duty.

His other achievements include winning:

- the 2007 Great Northern Derby beating Lombo Pocket Watch and Days Of Courage.
- the 2007 New Zealand Derby from Gotta Go Cullen and Montecito.
- the 2007 Harness Jewels 3YO Emerald at Ashburton from Mr Molly and Gotta Go Cullen.
- the 2007 Superstars 4YO championship at Addington from Running Outa Excuses and Keytoourdreams.
- the 2008 Harness Jewels 4YO Emerald at Cambridge from Gotta Go Cullen and Chilli.
- the 2008 Noel J Taylor Mile from Gotta Go Cullen and Mr Molly.
- the 2009 Len Smith Mile at Menangle Park Paceway in Australia, beating Smoken Up and Our Awesome Armbro. He returned a positive swab after the Len Smith Mile, but that was overturned on appeal.
- the 2010 Waikato Flying Mile, beating Trigirl Brigade and Pembrooke Benny.

Changeover was also first past the post in the New Zealand Sires Stakes 3yo Championship before being disqualified for a positive swab

Changeover was also placed:

- 4th in the 2007 New Zealand Trotting Cup behind Flashing Red, Monkey King and Tribute.
- 3rd in the 2008 New Zealand Free For All behind Auckland Reactor and Awesome Ambro.
- 2nd in the 2008 New Zealand Messenger behind Gotta Go Cullen. with Victory Spirit 3rd.
- 3rd in the 2009 Franklin Cup behind Rider On The Storm and Power Of Tara.
- 3rd in the 2009 New Zealand Free For All behind Monkey King and Nearea Franco, with Mr Feelgood 4th.

Changeover competed in two Inter Dominion Pacing Championship:

- 4th in the 2009 Grand final at Albion Park behind Mr Feelgood, Blacks A Fake and Karloo Mick.
- 4th in the 2010 Grand final at Menangle behind Blacks A Fake, Monkey King and Smoken Up.

Changeover was generally driven by David Butcher and occasionally Geoff Small. Peter Davis also drove him to a win at Addington Raceway as a 2 year old.

He was retired in March 2010 after running 5th in the 2010 Auckland Cup, behind Monkey King, Tintin In America, Baileys Dream and Bondy.

== Stud career ==
Changeover has sired over 100 individual winners, including:

- Run Oneover (Western Australia, 1:50.8; $554,998).
- Sudden Change (1:51.4)
- Dizzy Miss Lizzy (New Zealand 1:52), winner of the 2017 $150,000 Group One Diamond Jewels for 2YO Fillies.
- The Mustang (1:49.3)

In the 2020 season Changeover stood at Burwood Stud in Queensland for a service fee of $1,650 plus GST.

== See also ==
- Harness racing in New Zealand
