= Copy That (horse) =

New Zealand Standardbred racehorse

- Breed: Standardbred
- Sire: American Ideal (USA)
- Grandsire: Western Ideal (USA)
- Dam: Lively Nights
- Maternal grandsire: Live Or Die (USA)
- Sex: Stallion
- Foaled: 15 November 2016 (age 10)
- Country: New Zealand
- Trainer: Ray Green, Pukekohe
- Last updated on: 8 November 2022.

Copy That (foaled 15 November 2016) is a New Zealand Standardbred racehorse, notable for winning the New Zealand Trotting Cup in 2021 and 2022.

Copy That was bred by Woodlands Stud (NZ) Limited, owned by Merv and Meg Butterworth and he is trained by Ray Green at Lincoln Farms, Pukekohe.

Copy That's retirement was announced in September 2024 after rehabilitation of a knee injury was not fully successful.

In August 2025 Copy That's owners announced Copy That would stand at stud at Murray Veterinary Services in Western Australia for the 2025 breeding season.

== Racing career ==
Some of Copy That's notable performances include:

Year	Placing	Race	1st	2nd	3rd
December 2019	1st	Alabar 3YO Classic (Group 2, 2200m)	Copy That	One Change	Smooth Deal
March 2020	1st	Vero Flying Stakes (Group 2, 1980m)	Copy That	Change	Minstrel
October 2020	1st	Ashburton Flying Stakes	Copy That	Self Assured	Spankem
December 2020	3rd	Auckland Trotting Cup	Amazing Dream	Spankem	Copy That
January 2021	1st	McMillan Equine Feeds Flying Mile (Group 2, 1609m)	Copy That	Self Assured	Thefixer
April 2021	1st	Noel J Taylor Mile	Copy That	Bad To The Bone	Steel The Show
April 2021	1st	New Zealand Messenger Championship	Copy That	Bad To The Bone	Amazing Dream
July 2021	1st	Wondais Mate Open (1660m, Albion Park)	Copy That	Balraj	Rockin Marty
July 2021	2nd	Aqwa Construction Rising Sun (2138m, Albion Park, $250,000)	Amazing Dream	Copy That	Expensive Ego
July 2021	1st	Garrards Sunshine Sprint (1660m, Albion Park, $100,000)	Copy That	King Of Swing	Rockin Marty
November 2021	1st	New Zealand Trotting Cup	Copy That	Self Assured	South Coast Arden
September 2022	1st	TAB Gammalite Free For All (2240m, Melton)	Copy That	Crime Writer	Bettor Be The Bomb
November 2022	1st	New Zealand Trotting Cup	Copy That	Majestic Cruiser	Spankem
January 2023	1st	Ballarat Cup (Group 1, 2710m mobile, Ballarat) in a mile rate of 1:56.3 (800m in 56.1 seconds).	Copy That	Honolua Bay	Triple Eight
March 2023	1st	City of Auckland FFA (Group 2, 2200m, Alexandra Park)	Copy That	Kango	Smiffy's Terror
April 2023	2nd	Waikato Flying Mile (Group 2, 1609m, Cambridge)	Self Assured	Copy That	Akuta
April 2023	1st	The Race by Grins (2200m, Cambridge, $1,000,000)	Copy That	Old Town Road	Self Assured
April 2023	2nd	New Zealand Messenger Championship	Self Assured	Copy That	Better Eclipse

In 2023 when Copy That campaigned in Australia, Ray Green could not go with him as he was recovering from being kicked by a horse. Stable foreman Andrew Drake took care of Copy That. Blair Orange drove Copy That in his Ballarat Cup win.

== See also ==
- Harness racing in New Zealand
