= Terror to Love =

New Zealand Standardbred racehorse

Terror To Love (foaled 21 October 2007) is a New Zealand standardbred racehorse and stud stallion. He is best known for being a three-time winner of the New Zealand Trotting Cup, in 2011, 2012 and 2013. He was trained by Graham and Paul Court.

== Breeding ==
Bred by Terence McDonald, he was from Love to Live by Western Terror who was the 3YO Canadian Horse of the year and winner of the:

- $555,000 3YO Breeders Crown.
- $350,000 Windy City Pace.
- $335,000 Cane Pace.
- $235,000 Tattersalls Stake in a career best 1:48.3.
- $85,000 Bluegrass Stake.
- a heat of the Little Brown Jug.
- a heat of the Progress Stakes.

His Dam Sire was Live Or Die (USA). Terror to Love was a half brother of:

- Bad All Over (8 wins in New Zealand and 5 in Australia).
- Cee J P (1 win in New Zealand, 10 in Australia)
- Mach's Love (6 wins in New Zealand).
- Stunin Love (1 win in New Zealand).
- Well Said Love (2 wins in New Zealand).

== Racing career ==
Terror To Love started his racing career as a two-year-old in early 2010, with the Sapling Stakes his only win in six starts that season. Injury curtailed his season after 2nd's in both the NZ Kindergarten Stakes at Wyndham in February and a Sires Stakes heat at Forbury Park in March. As a three-year-old, he won eight races, with highlights including a dead-heat win in the Flying Stakes, and placings in the Great Northern Derby, New Zealand Derby and 3yo Emerald. These performances convinced connections to be one of few four-year-olds to win the New Zealand Trotting Cup.

His campaign for the 2011 New Zealand Cup went well, with a win in the Canterbury Classic and an unlucky fifth in the Ashburton Flying Stakes seeing him start second favourite in the Cup behind Australian champion Smoken Up. In the Cup, he was near last turning into the home straight, but sprinted fast down the outside to catch Smoken Up and win by 3/4 length.

A failed attempt at the Miracle Mile Pace followed the Cup victory, before the horse was spelled before an autumn campaign. His best results in the campaign were wins in the Noel J Taylor Mile and the 4yo Emerald Harness Jewells race, and second placings in the Auckland Pacing Cup and Easter Cup.

The 2012 New Zealand Cup campaign for Terror To Love started with an impressive win in the New Brighton Cup. A narrow second in the Canterbury Classic and an easy win in the Ashburton Flying Stakes followed, which saw the horse start a short-priced favourite in the Cup. In the Cup, he moved outside the leader with a lap to go, took the lead, then driver Ricky May elected to hand up to other runners, putting him three-back. However, like the previous year he sprinted too fast for the opposition, winning again by 3/4 length. He then contested the New Zealand Free-For-All three days later, finishing in third place.

Resuming racing in January 2013, Terror To Love won three straight races, including a heat of the Interdominion series at Auckland. He finished fourth behind Im Themightyquinn in the Inter Dominion Pacing Championship at Menangle, before running second behind the same horse in the Auckland Pacing Cup. The remainder of his five-year-old campaign produced wins in the Easter Cup and Five Year-Old Emerald, as well as a second placing in the Miracle Mile Pace. Those results earned him the title of New Zealand Harness Horse Of The Year.

Spelled after his Jewels win, Terror To Love had three starts leading into the NZ Cup of 2013. He was beaten a length 2nd by Christen Me in the Avon City Ford Cup in September, and beaten a neck 2nd to Christen Me in the Canterbury Classic in October. His final race before the cup produced a dominant 3 length win in the Ashburton Flying Stakes where Christen Me broke stride and was beaten over 100 lengths. Terror drew 5 in the cup & uncharacteristically galloped away, losing about 15 lengths and settling at the rear of the field. Sent 3-wide with cover from the mile peg, he was without cover from the bell & grabbed the lead 900m from home. Terror rallied gamely to hold off Fly Like An Eagle by a neck with a further 1-1/4 lengths to Christen Me in 3rd, thus becoming the 3rd horse to win the New Zealand Trotting Cup three times, joining Indianapolis (1934, 1935 and 1936) and False Step (1958, 1959 and 1960).

Terror To Love won the Auckland Pacing Cup in March 2014 beating Adore Me by 1 length. He then won both the Avon City Ford Cup and Canterbury Classic of 2014 before running 6th in the Ashburton Flying Stakes and a brave 4th to Adore Me in the New Zealand Trotting Cup.

Terror To Love's last win came via a tremendous head victory over Christen Me in the Cranbourne Cup in December 2014. His last race start was a third placing behind Christen Me in the Easter Cup at Addington in April 2015.

Terror To Love's record was 76 starts for 31 Wins, 16 seconds and 7 thirds and he earned total stakes of $2,429,978.

== Stud career ==
In 2015, Terror To Love commenced his stud career at Pinelea Farm, Christchurch.

His services were immediately in demand in both New Zealand and Australia and his first winner was Milwood Tilly at Newcastle in Australia.

Other progeny includes:

- Lavazza
- Smiffys Terror (from Mydadisachamp, by Christian Cullen), the 2022 Methven Cup winner
- Terry (from Carania by Cam's Trickster), winner of 7 races in New Zealand and 11 in Australia as at August 2025.
- Total Diva (from Jane, by Flashing Red), winner of the Ranji Bill Ladyship (Group 3, Menangle)
- Yoha

In August 2025 it was announced that Terror to Love had been retired from stud duties.

== See also ==
- Harness racing in New Zealand
