= Auckland Reactor =

New Zealand Standardbred racehorse

- Sire: Mach Three
- Dam: Atomic Lass
- Broodmare Sire: Soky's Atom
- Sex: Stallion
- Foaled: 3 November 2004
- Country: New Zealand
- Colour: Bay
- Breeder: A J Parker
- Owner: Auckland Reactor Ltd.
- Trainers: Mark Purdon & Grant Payne (New Zealand); Kelvin Harrison (USA)
- Record: 35:26–2–0
- Fastest Mile Rate: At 3: 1:55.9; At 4: 1:53.5; At 5: Q1:51.3 US
- Prizemoney: NZ$1,487,814

Group One Wins
| 2007; 2008; 2008; 2009; 2009; 2009; 2009 | New Zealand Sires Stakes 3yo Final; New Zealand Trotting Derby; New Zealand Free For All; Auckland Pacing Cup; Noel J Taylor Memorial Mile; New Zealand Messenger Championship; 4-Year-Old Emerald |
- *Correct as at 2 January 2009

Auckland Reactor is a New Zealand standardbred racehorse bred by Dr. Tony & Anne Parker. He was crowned New Zealand Horse of the Year in two seasons. He was also given the nickname The Reactor Factor because most Trainers supposedly feared him.

== 3-year-old season (2007–2008) ==
Auckland Reactor's raceday debut was much anticipated, with efforts at the trials leading many people to label him a top horse in the making. He won his debut at Timaru in September 2007. Three more wins followed before he won his first Group One race; the Sires Stakes 3-Year-Old Championship in November, where he came from an outside barrier draw to win easily. He returned to racing in January 2008 with a win. Another two wins in March preceded convincing wins in the Flying Stakes and the New Zealand Derby. In what was to be his final start for the season, he won the Southern Supremacy Stakes, where he recorded the fastest last 800m of a race ever in New Zealand of 54.0 seconds. This completed an undefeated 11-start season which saw him crowned New Zealand Horse of the Year.

In early May 2008, Auckland Reactor was purchased by an American syndicate for a reported $3.5 million, an unprecedented sum for a New Zealand pacer. Despite the sale, he remained with his original trainers, Mark Purdon and Grant Payne. His final race as a 3-year-old was set to be the 3-Year-Old Emerald, at the Harness Jewels raceday at Cambridge at the end of May. However, he had to be scratched from that race with an injury concern. That injury was expected to rule him out for the rest of 2008, including the New Zealand Trotting Cup in November.

== 4-year-old season (2008–2009) ==
Auckland Reactor recovered from the injury better than expected, and returned to racing with a win at Ashburton in late October. Connections ruled out a run in the New Zealand Trotting Cup, where he probably would have been favourite, because of his hampered lead-up and lack of standing start ability. Instead, he won the Junior Free-For-All on the Cup undercard, before meeting many Cup starters, including the winner Changeover, in the New Zealand Free-For-All. In the biggest test of his career, he won the Free-For-All in record time, confirming his status as clearly New Zealand's best pacer. A planned clash against Australian champion Blacks A Fake in the Miracle Mile Pace in Sydney was aborted due to the length of time it would take for the horse to return to New Zealand with quarantine issues. Instead, the horse contested the Franklin Cup at Alexandra Park in Auckland, where he broke the track record for 3200m. His first start for 2009 was in the Waikato Flying Mile at Cambridge, which he won in a time of 1.53.5, equalling the New Zealand record. He returned to Cambridge the following week to win the Cambridge 4yo Classic, taking his record to 17 wins from as many starts.

Auckland Reactor returned to Cambridge for a third straight week to contest the 4yo Futurity Stakes from a standing start. His poor standing start manners proved to be costly. He galloped for approximately the first 100 metres from the race and was tailed off the rest of the field. He managed to catch the field and get a position outside the leader, but he did not have enough energy left in the home straight to run past All Tiger, and his unbeaten record ended at 17. The time of the race (0.8 seconds outside the track record) showed how good Auckland Reactor had to be to get as close to winning as he did.

Auckland Reactor came back to winning form straight away in the inaugural Summer Cup at Addington on 31 January, and followed that up with a win in a minor free-for-all at Addington. He then contested the Auckland Cup, where he drew the outside barrier. After dropping to last at the start, he took the lead a lap from home and went on to win by 1 3/4 lengths, giving him his biggest win to date and taking his earnings past $1 million.

=== 2009 Inter Dominion Championships ===
One week after his Auckland Cup win, Auckland Reactor travelled to the Gold Coast in Australia to contest the Inter Dominion. In his first-round heat, he settled midfield before being pushed back to second-last when driver Mark Purdon elected not to move forward. He made good ground in the straight, but was too far back to run down Karloo Mick and avoid his second career defeat. Mark Purdon admitted that he made an error by not moving forward in the race, and was subsequently handed a six-week driving suspension. Following this defeat, Auckland Reactor drifted as favourite for the series, and the winner of the last three Inder Dominion Championships Blacks A Fake firmed with the bookies.

With Tony Herlihy in the sulky, Auckland Reactor won his second heat impressively and set up the 'trans-Tasman challenge' for the final on 28 March 2009. With Blacks A Fake being beaten later in the night by Changeover, Auckland Reactor regained favouritism for the final; however, the gap between the two lessened when Auckland Reactor drew the outside of the second row, while Blacks A Fake drew the inside of the front row. Gavin Lang drove the horse in the final, after Tony Herlihy went back on a previous decision to relinquish the training of finalist Gotta Go Cullen in order to take the drive. After getting into the parked position outside Blacks A Fake within the first lap, Auckland Reactor was never comfortable in the running, and dropped out to finish 100 metres behind the winner, Mr Feelgood, in last place. The failure was mainly a result of the horse striking the sulky in the running, upsetting him and causing him to choke down.

=== 4-year-old features ===
Auckland Reactor's final targets for the season were the major 4-year-old races in New Zealand. He won the first of those races, the Noel J Taylor Memorial Mile at Alexandra Park on 24 April, putting his unsuccessful Australian campaign behind him. He followed that win up with a victory in the New Zealand Messenger Championship at Alexandra Park; however, he was tiring over the final stages and his winning margin closed to a neck. His final target for the season was the 4-Year-Old Emerald at the Harness Jewels raceday at Ashburton where he was looking to make up for missing the 3-year-old version of the race. After getting an easy lead, he sprinted home in an outstanding last 400m time of 25.4 seconds to win by 3 lengths. His time for the mile distance of 1:53.8 was just outside his New Zealand record; however, that record was bettered in two races on Harness Jewels day.

=== Awards ===
Auckland Reactor won his second New Zealand Harness Horse of the Year award for his 2008/2009 achievements, as well as the 4-Year-Old Pacer and overall Pacer awards.

== 5-year-old season (2009–2010) ==
=== New Zealand Cup campaign ===
Auckland Reactor's first target as a 5-year-old was to be the New Zealand Trotting Cup on 10 November. His first race in the lead-up to the Cup was at Addington on 2 October, where he again missed away from the standing start. The lost ground at the start meant he tired to finish sixth after challenging for the lead around the final turn. His standing start manners did not improve in subsequent workouts, and the connections chose to abort his Cup campaign.

=== Cup Week ===
Auckland Reactor again won the Junior Free-For-All on the Cup undercard. Like in 2008, he contested the New Zealand Free-For-All on the following Friday, where he ran fifth of six runners after being taken on in the lead.

=== Miracle Mile Pace ===
After the New Zealand Free-For-All, Auckland Reactor was sent to Australia for the Miracle Mile Pace at Menangle. After settling at the back of the field from his wide draw, he was unable to make sufficient ground off a fast-run race, and ended up finishing sixth behind New Zealand Cup winner Monkey King in an Australian record of 1:50.8.

=== North American Campaign ===
Auckland Reactor flew out to North America at the end of January 2010, and was sent to the stable of Kelvin Harrison. His first-up race, at the Meadowlands on 22 May, ended in a disappointing 6th of 7, although the overall time was a fast 1:47.3. He improved at his second start when running fourth at Chester; however, his next start resulted in a last placing in a weaker grade at the same track, with trainer Harrison saying that the horse has not handled the hot weather in the US. Also, there is evidence to suggest that he was flipping his soft palate, thereby cutting his airway – a problem which had affected him during his 2009 campaign. It was eventually decided to return the horse to Mark Purdon and Grant Payne in New Zealand for another campaign.

== 6-year-old season (2010/2011) ==
Plans to stand Auckland Reactor at stud for the 2010 season were abandoned after some ownership changes and a willingness to focus on a return to racing. He returned to racing on 12 February at Ashburton, winning in a time of 1:52.9 for the mile (0.8 seconds outside the New Zealand record). However, he finished at the back of the field in his next two starts, including the Auckland Cup, after failing to settle in the running. He was set to contest the Inter Dominion series at Auckland starting 25 March, but was scratched after suffering an attack of Colitis X a few days prior.

== 7-year-old season (2011/2012) ==
Auckland Reactor returned as a 7-year-old on 30 September in the Avon City Ford Cup. He showed little sign of his previous standing start concerns, settling towards the back of the field and finished strongly to win by a head. This was followed by a fast-finishing run for fifth in the Canterbury Classic. He then contested the Ashburton Flying Stakes; a main lead-up race to the New Zealand Trotting Cup. Here, he moved around the field to sit outside the leader with 1000 metres to go, before running clear in the straight to claim a convincing 2 1/2 length win, breaking his last-800-metre record with a 53.8-second time. The performance made him one of the favourites for the New Zealand Cup; however, a hoof injury forced him to be scratched from that race.

Resuming in Australia in January 2012, Auckland Reactor narrowly won the Pure Steel at Ballarat in track record time. This was followed by a close second off a 10m handicap in the A G Hunter Cup.

=== 2012 Inter Dominion Series ===
Auckland Reactor was flown to Perth after the Hunter Cup to contest the Inter Dominion series. He contested the first heat of the series on 17 February, which resulted in a 2-metre victory. He followed that with comfortable victories in the second and third heats, which saw him start among the favourites in the Final. In the Final, he dropped back from the outside draw and moved around to sit outside the leader around the halfway mark, before fading in the straight to finish seventh. He was later found to be suffering from a virus, and did not race again that season.

== 8-year-old season (2012/2013) ==
Auckland Reactor started his preparation for the 2012 New Zealand Cup with two starts at Addington, galloping at the start both times. He finished a strong sixth first-up in the New Brighton Cup, but a disappointing eighth in the Canterbury Classic, after which another hoof injury was found. He recovered to start in the Louisson Handicap at Addington, but interference at the start contributed to him galloping again, with the horse eventually moving to the lead before tiring to run last. Despite these setbacks, he finally started in his first New Zealand Cup. However, his big race bad luck continued when, despite starting well, he tired to finish a clear last and was found to have an infection after the race. After getting over that infection, he resumed racing in the Waikato Flying Mile, where he ran a strong-finishing fourth.

== Pedigree ==
Pedigree of Auckland Reactor, bay horse, 2004
| Sire Mach Three 1999 | Matt's Scooter (USA); 1985 | Direct Scooter | Sampson Direct |
| Sire Mach Three 1999 | Matt's Scooter (USA); 1985 | Direct Scooter | Noble Claire |
| Sire Mach Three 1999 | Matt's Scooter (USA); 1985 | Ellen's Glory | Meadow Skipper |
| Sire Mach Three 1999 | Matt's Scooter (USA); 1985 | Ellen's Glory | Gloria Barmin |
| Sire Mach Three 1999 | All Included; 1986 | Abercrombie | Silent Majority |
| Sire Mach Three 1999 | All Included; 1986 | Abercrombie | Bergdorf |
| Sire Mach Three 1999 | All Included; 1986 | Debra Ann Hanover | Most Happy Fella |
| Sire Mach Three 1999 | All Included; 1986 | Debra Ann Hanover | Darling Almahurst |
| Dam Atomic Lass 1986 | Soky's Atom; 1978 | Albatross | Meadow Skipper |
| Dam Atomic Lass 1986 | Soky's Atom; 1978 | Albatross | Voodoo Hanover |
| Dam Atomic Lass 1986 | Soky's Atom; 1978 | Soky's Seal | Adios Vic |
| Dam Atomic Lass 1986 | Soky's Atom; 1978 | Soky's Seal | Adiana Hanover |
| Dam Atomic Lass 1986 | Tudoress; 1972 | Tudor Hanover | Tar Heel |
| Dam Atomic Lass 1986 | Tudoress; 1972 | Tudor Hanover | Time Wave |
| Dam Atomic Lass 1986 | Tudoress; 1972 | Russley Song | Flying Song |
| Dam Atomic Lass 1986 | Tudoress; 1972 | Russley Song | Russley Girl |

- Auckland Reactor was inbred 4 × 4 to Meadow Skipper, meaning that this stallion appears twice in the fourth generation of his pedigree.

== See also ==
- Auckland Reactor's Official Website
- Auckland Reactor wins the New Zealand Free For All – Youtube
