= Kerryn Manning =

Australian horse trainer (born 1976)

Kerryn Manning (born 10 July 1976) is an Australian horse trainer-driver and a world champion reinswoman in the sport of harness racing.

== Early life ==
Manning was born in Melbourne, Australia to Peter and Barbara Manning. Her father, Peter Manning, is also a trainer-driver in harness racing, and after Manning completed Year 10 of high school, she started working for him.

== Racing career ==
Manning has driven over 3500 winners in her career, giving her the world record for number of career wins for a female reinswoman.

She was the first driver to win 300 races in a season in either Australia or New Zealand and is also the first woman to drive a winner in both the Southern and Northern hemispheres.

On 11 November 2015, Manning drove Arden Rooney to win the New Zealand Trotting Cup at Addington Raceway and became the first woman to drive a winner of the Cup.

== Recognition ==
- 2001: received Harness Racing Victoria's Pearl Kelly Award for outstanding achievement within the sport.
- 2003: received Harness Racing Australia's Meritorious Service Award
- 2006: named on the 2006 Victorian Honour Roll of Women "for her achievements in harness racing"
- 2013: inducted into the Harness Racing Victoria Hall of Fame. She was the first woman to receive this honour
- 2014: the 13th recipient of Harness Racing Victoria's Gordon Rothacker Medal, the organisation's highest individual honour
