= Self Assured =

New Zealand Standardbred racehorse

- Breed: Standardbred
- Sire: Bettor's Delight (USA)
- Grandsire: Cam's Card Shark
- Dam: Star Of Venus
- Maternal grandsire: Christian Cullen
- Sex: Gelding
- Foaled: 26 October 2015 (age 11)
- Country: New Zealand
- Trainer: Mark Purdon, Natalie Rasmussen and Hayden Cullen, Rolleston

Awards
- 2022 Harness Racing New Zealand pacer of the year
- Last updated on: 13 April 2024.

Self Assured (foaled 26 October 2015) is a New Zealand Standardbred racehorse, notable for winning the New Zealand Trotting Cup in 2020 and the Auckland Trotting Cup in 2019 and 2022.

Bred by Reg Caldow from Wellington and owned by Mrs Jean Feiss from Melbourne, Australia, he was trained by the All Stars stable at Rolleston.

== Racing career ==
Notable performances by Self Assured include:

Placing	Year	Race	1st	2nd	3rd
1st	2019	South East Derby (G3, 2138m, Albion Park)	Self Assured	Lochinvar Art	Jesse Duke
1st	2019	Queensland Derby (G1, 2680m, Albion Park)	Self Assured	Lochinvar Art	Jesse Duke
3rd	2019	Ashburton Flying Stakes	Spankem	Thefixer	Self Assured
1st	2019	Auckland Cup	Self Assured	Thefixer	Triple Eight
1st	2020	Hondo Grattan Stakes	Self Assured	Demon Delight	Max Delight
1st	2020	Canterbury Classic	Self Assured	Spankem	Tango Tara
2nd	2020	Ashburton Flying Stakes	Copy That	Self Assured	Spankem
1st	2020	New Zealand Trotting Cup	Self Assured	Spankem	Ashley Locaz
2nd	2020	Chariots Of Fire	Lochinvar Art	Self Assured	Max Delight
2nd	2020	Ballarat Cup	AGs White Socks	Self Assured	Chase Auckland
1st	2021	Easter Cup	Self Assured	Spankem	Amazing Dream
3rd	2021	Canterbury Classic	South Coast Arden	Pembrook Playboy	Self Assured
1st	2021	Ashburton Flying Stakes	Self Assured	Classie Brigade	Pembrook Playboy
2nd	2021	New Zealand Trotting Cup	Copy That	Self Assured	South Coast Arden
2nd	2021	New Zealand Free For All	South Coast Arden	Self Assured	Krug
1st	2022	The Race by Grins (inaugural event)	Self Assured	Majestic Cruiser	Spankem
3rd	2022	Noel J Taylor Memorial Mile	Spankem	Hot And Treacherous	Self Assured
2nd	2022	New Zealand Messenger Championship	Majestic Cruiser	Self Assured	A G's White Socks
1st	2022	Auckland Cup, driven by Natalie Rasmussen due to Mark Purdon being suspended	Self Assured	Spankem	Kango.
1st	2022	Roy Purdon Memorial Handicap (inaugural event, Listed, 2200m, Alexandra Park)	Self Assured	Kango	Bad To The Bone
3rd	2022	Canterbury Classic	B D Joe	Spankem	Self Assured
5th	2022	New Zealand Trotting Cup, after suffering a flat tyre	Copy That	Majestic Cruiser	Spankem
1st	2022	New Zealand Free For All	Self Assured	Majestic Cruiser	Old Town Road
2nd	2022	Summer Cup Free For All	BD Joe	Self Assured	Spankem
2nd	2022	Invercargill Cup	Krug	Self Assured	Macandrew Aviator
1st	2023	Waikato Flying Mile (G2 1609m, Cambridge)	Self Assured	Copy That	Akuta.
3rd	2023	The Race by Grins ($1 Million, 2200m Free for All)	Copy That	Old Town Road	Self Assured
2nd	2023	Noel J Taylor Memorial Mile	Akuta	Self Assured	Better Eclipse
1st	2023	New Zealand Messenger Championship	Self Assured	Copy That	Bettor Eclipse
2nd	2023	Auckland Cup	Akuta	Self Assured	Smiffy's Terror
1st	2023	New Zealand Free For All	Self Assured	Akuta	Beach Ball
2nd	2023	Summer Cup (G3 1980m Addington)	Beach Ball	Self Assured	American Me
2nd	2023	Invercargill Cup (G1 3200m)	American Me	Self Assured	Beach Ball
2nd	2024	New Zealand Messenger Championship	Mach Shard	Self Assured	Better Eclipse
2nd	2024	Roy Purdon Memorial (Listed, 2200m, Alexandra Park)	American Me	Self Assured	Old Town Road
2nd	2024	Auckland Cup	Better Eclipse	Self Assured	Republican Party

== See also ==
- Harness racing in New Zealand
