= Smoken Up =

Australian Standardbred racehorse

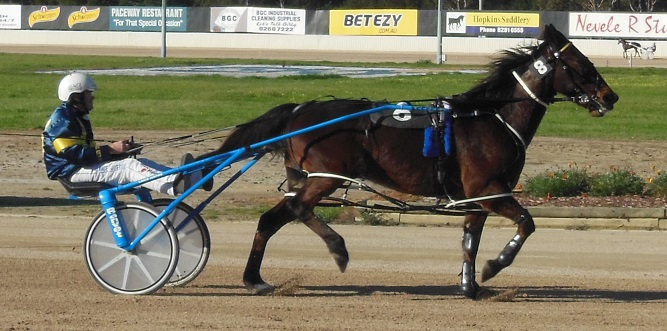
- Breed: Standardbred
- Sire: Tinted Cloud
- Grandsire: In The Pocket
- Dam: Carnlough Bay
- Damsire: Camtastic
- Sex: Gelding
- Foaled: 7 November 2002
- Country: Australia
- Color: Bay
- Breeder: SM & CM Dunlop; EJ & DW Monk
- Owner: A P Kay; P G Gadsby; A B Bonney; M J Van Rens; R J Kay; V MacDonald; L D Locastro
- Trainer: Lance Justice
- Record: 153:74-39-15
- Earnings: $3,607,985

Major wins
- Miracle Mile Pace (2010, 2011); Len Smith Mile (2008, 2010, 2011, 2012); South Australian Cup (2008, 2010, 2012, 2013); New Zealand Free For All (2011); Victoria Cup (2011); Cordina Sprint (2013)

Awards
- Australasian Pacers Grand Circuit Champion (2012); Victorian Harness Racing Hall of Fame (2023)

Honours
- First standardbred to break the 1:50 barrier outside North America; Australasian Mile Record (three times); Smoken Up Sprint
- Last updated on 2016-02-06

Smoken Up (foaled 7 November 2002) is an Australian champion Standardbred race horse bred in New Zealand. He was the first pacer outside North America to record a mile in under 1:50. He was known as Trigger.

== Early racing career ==
Smoken Up began racing in New Zealand and had 10 race starts before his export to Australia. At age four he was ready to travel to Sydney for the Chariots of Fire at Harold Park but the race was cancelled due to the 2007 Australian equine influenza outbreak.

== 2007–08 ==
In 2007–08 Smoken Up contested several of the most important races in Australia. In the Victoria Cup he was second to Robin Hood. He then won the South Australian Cup where he defeated Queensland pacer Slipnslide who had only been released from special equine influenza quarantine arrangements just before the race. In the A G Hunter Cup he was second behind Blacks A Fake who had started from a 30 metres handicap and in the Inter Dominion Final, which was hosted by Moonee Valley that season he was third behind Blacks A Fake and Divisive. In June 2008 the new Menangle Park Paceway opened and Smoken Up won the Len Smith Mile on the opening day in a time of 1:51.9 which was the fastest mile recorded in Australia or New Zealand at the time. He won 9 of his 22 starts for the season and $427,946.

== 2008–09 ==
Smoken Up's 2008-09 season was interrupted by injury. He did still manage to finish second to New Zealand pacer Changeover in the Len Smith Mile and win the feature race on the opening day of the new track at Melton near Melbourne.

== 2009–10 ==
In the 2009 Miracle Mile Pace Smoken Up finished second behind New Zealand horse Monkey King. The race was run in a time of 1:50.8 which was the fastest mile in Australia or New Zealand to that time. After second places in both the Victoria Cup and South Australian Cup Smoken Up was third to Blacks A Fake and Monkey King in the Inter Dominion at Menangle. He then returned to Menangle in April to win the Len Smith Mile for a second year in a time of 1:50.9. Smoken Up won 8 of his 17 starts for the season and $442,244.

== 2010–11 ==
Smoken Up won the 2010 Miracle Mile Pace defeating Blacks A Fake in a time of 1:50.3. It reduced the Australasian record of 1:50.9 set by Monkey King the previous year. He then won the South Australian Cup again before contesting the Inter Dominion which was hosted by Alexandra Park, Auckland in 2011 in March and April. Smoken Up won both his heats and in the final he led home an all-Australian finish beating Western Australian pacer Im Themightyquinn and Blacks A Fake from Queensland. It was announced later in the month that Smoken Up had returned a positive swab and he was later disqualified with legal challenges not successful. On April 30, 2011 Smoken Up once again won the Len Smith Mile at Menangle Park Paceway. This time the mile took only 1:48.5 which not only smashed his record set in the Miracle Mile Pace but it was the first time 1:50 had been broken outside of North America. He won 9 of his 13 starts in Australia for the season and $547,151. He was awarded the Australian Horse of the Year title but was stripped of the honour due to the Inter Dominion positive swab.

== 2011–12 ==
Smoken Up travelled to Brisbane for the opening of the Australasian Pacers Grand Circuit and finished second to Mr Feelgood at Albion Park in the Queensland Pacing Championship. He travelled to New Zealand where he finished second in the New Zealand Trotting Cup behind Terror To Love and won the New Zealand Free For All. He then won a second Miracle Mile Pace defeating Karloo Mick and Im Themightyquinn and the Victoria Cup. Smoken Up won the South Australian Cup with his regular driver Lance Justice replaced by Greg Sugars as Justice had recently broken his ankle and leg. Smoken Up travelled to Perth for the Inter Dominion at Gloucester Park following a track record win at Melton where he won in a 1:51.1 rate for 1740 metres. He was undefeated in his three heats of the series along with Im Themightyquinn and Auckland Reactor. However, in the final Smoken Up galloped effectively ending his winning chance. In April he won the Len Smith Mile at Menangle for the fourth time. He won 12 of 20 starts in Australia for the season and $1,084,957.

== 2012–13 ==
In 2013 Smoken Up won his fourth South Australian Cup equalling the record for most wins in the race held by Gammalite.

== 2013–14 ==
Smoken Up won the Cordina Sprint at Menangle breaking 1:50 which earned him another start in the Miracle Mile Pace after his racing career had been in jeopardy due to injury. During the season it was announced that Smoken Up would be retired after a farewell tour including races in Sydney and Adelaide. He made his last race start at Melton on September 6, 2014.

== Legacy and awards ==
In July 2014 it was announced by Harness Racing Victoria that the race known as The Legends would be renamed the Smoken Up Sprint.

In 2023 Smoken Up was inducted into the Victorian Harness Racing Hall of Fame.
