= Indianapolis (horse) =

New Zealand Standardbred racehorse

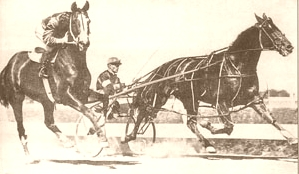
- Indianapolis attempting to break 2:00 minutes over a mile
- Breed: Standardbred
- Sire: Wrack (USA)
- Grandsire: Peter The Great
- Dam: Estella Amos (USA)
- Maternal grandsire: Dale Axworthy
- Sex: Stallion
- Foaled: 1 September 1929
- Country: New Zealand
- Colour: Bay
- Breeder: Arthur Nicholl, Denbar Lodge, Ashburton (NZ)
- Owner: George J. Barton
- Trainer: F. Claude Dunleavy, Addington

Earnings
- $20,514

Major wins
- 1932 Great Northern Derby; 1933 Auckland Pacing Cup; 1934 New Zealand Trotting Cup; 1935 New Zealand Trotting Cup; 1936 New Zealand Trotting Cup
- Last updated on: 17 November 2010.

Indianapolis was a New Zealand bred Standardbred racehorse. He is notable in that he won three New Zealand Trotting Cup races, the richest harness race, and sometimes the richest horse race in New Zealand. Indianapolis is one of three horses to win the NZ Trotting Cup three times, the others being False Step and Terror to Love. He held the world record for a three-year-old, a record which stood for 14 years.

He was a brother to Tondeleyo (a notable taproot dam) and Miraculous (contested two Inter Dominion heats, sire) and was a half-brother to the sire, Red Raider.

He won the following major races:

- 1932 Great Northern Derby. Driven by E C McDermott.
- 1933 Auckland Pacing Cup beating Sir Guy and Pegaway. Driven by W J (Bill) Tomkinson.
- 1934 New Zealand Trotting Cup (handicapped 12 yards) beating Blue Mountain (front) and Harold Logan (72 yds). Driven by E C McDermott.
- 1935 New Zealand Trotting Cup (48 yards) beating War Buoy (front) and Red Shadow (48 yds). Driven by J Fraser jnr.
- 1936 New Zealand Trotting Cup (48 yards) beating Red Shadow (24 yds) and War Buoy (front). Driven by J Fraser jnr.

== See also ==
- Harness racing in New Zealand
