= Monkey King (horse) =

New Zealand Standardbred racehorse

- Breed: Standardbred
- Discipline: Pacing
- Sire: Sands A Flyin
- Grandsire: Beach Towel
- Dam: Tuapeka Vale
- Maternal grandsire: Smooth Fella
- Sex: Gelding
- Foaled: 3 October 2002
- Country: New Zealand
- Breeder: Mrs June M Sharples, Lesley K and Matthew J Lewis
- Owner: Cavalla Bloodstock Limited / Dancingonmoonlight Limited (Robert Famularo)
- Trainer: (1) Steven Reid (2) Brendon Hill

Earnings
- $3,471,575

Major wins
- 2009 Miracle Mile Pace; 2009 New Zealand Free For All; 2009 New Zealand Trotting Cup; 2010 Auckland Trotting Cup; 2010 New Zealand Free For All; 2010 New Zealand Trotting Cup

Honors
- Mile rate: 1:50.8
- Last updated on: 28 July 2011.

Monkey King is a leading New Zealand Standardbred racehorse. He is most noted for winning the New Zealand Trotting Cup and New Zealand Free-For-All double in two consecutive years, in 2009 and 2010, the first time this has ever been achieved. He also won the Miracle Mile Pace and the Auckland Trotting Cup in the 2009/10 season, as well as running second in the Inter Dominion Grand Final. As a result, he achieved the highest-earning season ever by a New Zealand pacer, and was crowned New Zealand Horse of the Year. These victories came after several top successes as a 3 and 4 year-old and consistently rating among the top horses in New Zealand over the following years. He was inducted to the Addington Harness Hall of Fame in 2019. He was at the time New Zealand's richest ever pacer with over $3,400,000 in stakes.

Monkey King was selected by the North Island horse trainer Steven Reid. He trained the horse up to early 2009 until the owner moved the horse to Brendon (Benny) Hill's establishment in Christchurch.

His regular drivers were initially Todd Mitchell and Steven Reid and then Ricky May.

After his racing career he was used in Equestrian events.

== Major racing performances ==
- December 2005 - 1st Great Northern Derby beating Armbro The Thug and Jays Debut
- May 2007 - 1st New Zealand Messenger beating Divisive and All Promises
- June 2007 - 1st 4YO Emerald beating Divisive and Beau Rivage
- November 2007 - 2nd New Zealand Trotting Cup behind Flashing Red with Tribute 3rd
- March 2008 - 1st Easter Cup beating Classic Cullen and Baileys Dream
- February 2009 - 1st City of Auckland Free For All beating Pembrook Benny and Awesome Armbro
- April 2009 - 1st Easter Cup beating All Tiger and Pembrook Penny
- October 2009 - 1st Canterbury Classic beating Nearea Franco and Mr Feelgood
- November 2009 - 1st Miracle Mile Pace beating Smoken Up and Karloo Mick
- November 2009 - 1st New Zealand Trotting Cup beating Bettor's Strike and Smoken Up
- November 2009 - 1st New Zealand Free For All beating Nearea Falcon and Changeover
- February 2010 - 1st Inter Dominion heat beating Hava Bonvoyage and Tanabi Bromac
- February 2010 - 1st Inter Dominion heat beating Western Cam and Our Awesome Armbro
- March 2010 - 2nd Inter Dominion Grand Final behind Blacks A Fake with Smoken Up 3rd
- March 2010 - 1st Auckland Trotting Cup beating Tintin in America and Baileys Dream
- October 2010 - 1st Canterbury Classic beating Power of Tara and Georgetown
- November 2010 - 1st New Zealand Trotting Cup beating Smoken Up and Sleepy Tripp
- November 2010 - 1st New Zealand Free For All beating Bondy and Smoken Up
- September 2011 - 1st Hannon Memorial (Group 3 2600m, Oamaru) beating Second Wind and Rangataua Ray

== See also ==
- Harness racing in New Zealand
