= Lazarus (horse) =

New Zealand Standardbred racehorse

- Breed: Standardbred
- Sire: Bettor's Delight
- Grandsire: Cam's Card Shark (US)
- Dam: Bethany
- Maternal grandsire: Christian Cullen
- Sex: Stallion
- Foaled: 12 November 2012
- Country: New Zealand
- Breeder: G Chin, Studholme Bloodstock Limited
- Owner: Mrs G J Kennard, P I Kennard, Trevor G Casey, K Riseley
- Trainer: Mark Purdon and Natalie Rasmussen (NZ)

Record
- 51 starts: 37 wins 12 placings

Earnings
- NZ$4,423,391

Honours
- New Zealand harness racing horse of the year (2x)
- Last updated on: 2021-09-05.

Lazarus (foaled 12 November 2012) is a former champion New Zealand Standardbred race-horse and is now a stud stallion.

== Racing career ==
He was trained by Mark Purdon and Natalie Rasmussen and generally driven by Mark Purdon when winning a number of major races in New Zealand and Australia:

After he won his second NZ Trotting Cup in November 2017, he headed overseas firstly to Australia and then to the United States and Canada where he performed with distinction, including winning the $325,000 Dan Patch Stakes on debut at Hoosier Park.

Year	Placing	Race	1st	2nd	3rd
2015	1st	New Zealand Yearling Sales 2YO Open Mobile Pace (1950m, Addington)	Lazarus	Shandale	Motu Premier
2015	1st	Harness Jewels 2YO Emerald	Lazarus	Motu Premier	Chase The Dream
2015	1st	NRM Sires Stakes Series 3YO Final	Lazarus	Chase The Dream	Classie Brigade
2015	1st	New Zealand Yearling Sales Series Final	Lazarus	Chase The Dream	Art Form
Jan 2016	1st	Victoria Derby	Lazarus	Three Ways	Don’t Hold Back
2016	1st	Great Northern Derby	Lazarus	Chase The Dream	Walkinshaw
2016	1st	New Zealand Trotting Derby	Lazarus	Classie Brigade	Shandale
Nov 2016	1st	New Zealand Trotting Cup.	Lazarus	Tiger Tara	Titan Banner
Nov 2016	1st	New Zealand Free For All	Lazarus	Christen Me	Tiger Tara
Jan 2017	1st	Victoria Cup	Lazarus	Major Crocker	Bling It On
2017	1st	Chariots Of Fire (G1, 1609m, Menangle)	Lazarus	Our Waikiki Beach	Salty Robyn
2017	1st	Inter Dominion Pacing Championship at Gloucester Park, Perth	Lazarus	Chicago Bull	Tiger Tara
Nov 2017	1st	New Zealand Trotting Cup.	Lazarus	Jack's Legend	Tiger Tara
Feb 2018	1st	A G Hunter Cup	Lazarus	Soho Tribeca	Heaven Rocks

== Breeding career ==
Following his retirement as a racehorse Lazarus was put to stallion duties, initially standing in North America and New South Wales. He served 136 mares in his first season in North America. He was later moved to the South Auckland stud farm Alabar where his fee was set at $7500 for his first season in New Zealand. In 2022 he was moved to Nevele R Stud in Canterbury.

His progeny has included:

- Handlelikeaporsche, multiple North American Grand circuit winner
- Voukefalas, the two-time New Jersey Sires Stakes champion.

== See also ==
- Harness racing in New Zealand
