= Steven Reid (harness racer) =

Steven Reid is a driver of standardbred racehorses in New Zealand.

== Background ==
Reid began training in 1988 and in that time he has trained winners of:

- 27 wins with Les Purdon from 1988-1990.
- 60 wins with Tremain Thorby from 1999-2000.
- 168 wins with Graeme Rogerson from 2009-2010.
- 73 wins with Simon McMullan from 2014-2017.
- over 700 wins as a sole trainer (up to the 2020 season).

Steven won the NZ Harness Premiership for Training in 1997 and 1998.

In 2009 Steven parted from his former owner Robert Famularo ending a 9-year relationship. and went into partnership with renowned thoroughbred trainer Graeme Rogerson.

He was the previous trainer of harness racing horses like Monkey King, Baileys Dream and Fake Denario.

He considers his best horse was the highly acclaimed Gold Ace. Gold Ace won the 2010 NRM Sire Stakes Final, the New Zealand Free-For-All in a track record 1:52.6 mile rate, the Waikato Flying Mile in 1:53.3 and the Cranbourne Pacing Cup.

Steven trains from Pukekohe.

== Driving Colours ==
The Steven Reid Pukekohe barn has a turquoise/black set. However, some of Steven Reid's horses run in Breckon Bloodstock colours.

== See also ==
- Harness racing in New Zealand
