= Il Vicolo =

New Zealand Standardbred racehorse

- Breed: Standardbred
- Sire: Vance Hanover (USA)
- Grandsire: Albatross (USA)
- Dam: Burgundy Lass (NZ)
- Maternal grandsire: Noodlum (NZ)
- Sex: Stallion
- Foaled: 27 October 1991
- Country: New Zealand
- Colour: Brown
- Breeder: R.A. & J.A. Yarndley (NZ)
- Owner: J H Seaton & M H Purdon (NZ)
- Trainer: M Purdon (NZ)

Record
- 53: 31-8-2

Earnings
- NZ$1,580,948

Major wins
- 1996 New Zealand Trotting Cup; 1995 Great Northern Derby; 1995 New Zealand Trotting Cup; 1995 New Zealand Trotting Derby; 1994 New Zealand Sires Stakes 3yo Final

Honours
- Best mile rate: 1:56.7; 1995 Harness Horse of the Year
- Last updated on: 24 October 2011.

Il Vicolo (foaled 27 October 1991) was a New Zealand Standardbred racehorse. He is notable for winning the richest harness horse race in New Zealand, the New Zealand Trotting Cup, twice.

As 1995 Harness Horse of the Year, he featured on a New Zealand postage stamp. Il Vicolo had already had some memorable victories to his credit including the New Zealand Derby-Great Northern Derby double and the New South Wales Derby. Il Vicolo won the New Zealand Trotting Cup – Air New Zealand Free For All double. He went on to win the NZ Cup a second time in 1996.

== Major performances ==
Placing	Year	Race	1st	2nd	3rd
1st	1994	New Zealand Sires Stakes 3yo Final	Il Vicolo	Anvil's Star	Ready For Love
1st	1995	Great Northern Derby	Il Vicolo	Tabaret	Ari Vance
1st	1995	New Zealand Trotting Derby	Il Vicolo	Ready For Love	Brocketsbrae
1st	1995	Kaikōura Cup (2400m)	Il Vicolo	Hoppy's Jet	Ginger Man
1st	1995	New Zealand Trotting Cup	Il Vicolo	Just Royce	Master Musician
1st	1995	New Zealand Free For All	Il Vicolo	Brabham	Lento
1st	1996	Equine Pacific Flying Mile (Group 2 1609m, Alexandra Park)	Il Vicolo	Brabham	Victor Supreme
1st	1996	Kaikōura Cup	Il Vicolo	Prince Rashad	Grinaldi
1st	1996	New Zealand Trotting Cup (10m Hcp)	Il Vicolo	Anvil's Star	Surprise Package

== See also ==
- Harness racing in New Zealand
