= New Zealand Trotting Cup =

Annual harness horse race in Christchurch, New Zealand

- Class: Group I
- Location: Addington Raceway; Christchurch, New Zealand
- Inaugurated: 1904
- Race type: Standardbred - Flat racing
- Website: www.addington.co.nz

Race information
- Distance: 3200m (2 miles)
- Surface: Dirt
- Track: Left-handed oval
- Qualification: Three-year-olds and up
- Purse: NZ$800,000 (2026)

The New Zealand Cup for standardbred horses, also known as either the New Zealand Trotting Cup or the New Zealand Pacing Cup, is a Group One (G1) harness race held annually by the New Zealand Metropolitan Trotting Club at Addington Raceway in Christchurch, New Zealand.

It is generally considered the country's most prestigious harness racing event. The New Zealand Trotting cup is considered as Canterbury's biggest day on its social calendar. Many flock to Addington for the glitz and glamour of the event, rather than the horse racing.

== Christchurch Cup week ==
The race is held during Show Week on the second Tuesday in November, three days before the Show Day public holiday. The public holiday in Christchurch is the observance of the Canterbury Anniversary Holiday (16 December in reality). This race meeting, along with other premier race meetings form part of Canterbury's carnival week along with the Canterbury Agricultural and Pastoral Show. Until 1999 the Show was held at showgrounds adjacent to Addington Raceway.

Christchurch Cup week at Addington raceway also includes the following major races on the Friday (Show Day):

- the New Zealand Free For All for pacers
- the Dominion Handicap for trotters

For thoroughbred horses the week also features:

- the New Zealand 2000 Guineas on the first Saturday
- the Coupland's Bakeries Mile on the Wednesday
- the Stewards Handicap sprint on the final Saturday
- the New Zealand Cup on the final Saturday

Up until 2025 there was also greyhound racing on the Thursday, including the following Group 1 races:

- the New Zealand Galaxy - C5f 295m ($40,000 stake)
- the New Zealand Greyhound Cup - C5f 525m ($100,000)
- the New Zealand Stayers Cup - C2df 732m ($40,000)

Greyhound racing was banned by the New Zealand Government with effect from 1 August 2026.

== Cup history ==
The first New Zealand Cup was run in 1904.

Three horses have won the race three times, they are Indianapolis, False Step and Terror To Love. False Step later went to the United States where he beat the acknowledged American champion of the time, Adios Butler. A number of horses have won the race twice including Harold Logan and Highland Fling who both won their second cups off the very large handicap of 60 yards and Lazarus.

In 1929, 1930 and 1931 the New Zealand Cup was run with heats: a first division and second division and then the final.

The 1962 New Zealand Cup days was one of the few days when there has been rain on the Cup day. This was the year that Lordship beat the hot favorite Cardigan Bay.

In 1963 Cardigan Bay who is arguably New Zealand's greatest ever horse won the Cup and also won the Inter Dominion in Australia. Cardigan Bay, in association with New Jersey master reinsman Stanley Dancer went on to become the first million dollar winner in the sport's history.

A common feature of the race is the inclusion of Australian trained runners, including the winners:

- Steel Jaw in 1983
- Lightning Blue in 1987
- Arden Rooney in 2015
- Swayzee in 2023 and 2024
- Kingman in 2025 (Leap To Fame was 2nd)
- Leap To Fame in 2026.

The 2008 running of the race was won by Changeover, driven by David Butcher and trained by Geoff Small, in a then race/world record time (1.58.8-mile rate). The race was delayed by over 6 minutes due to fractious horses and a damaged wheel to one of the favoured runners. After being slow away, Butcher moved forward to lead, and soon after took a trail behind one of the other favourites, Baileys Dream. In an exciting finish, Butcher used the passing lane to pass Baileys Dream, with Report for Duty third for Anthony Butt (who was trying for 3 wins in a row in the NZ Cup). It was another dream result for the ATC Trotting Syndicate, who own the horse. The last horse home, favoured runner Monkey King, was credited with a time of 3.58.7, which was fast enough to have won every prior NZ Cup, except the 2007 running, won by Flashing Red.

In 2013 Terror To Love equaled the record for most wins, having won the previous two years. Despite breaking stride at the start of the race, giving the leaders a 15-length head start (about 37m or 3 seconds), Terror To Love made up the distance slowly and worked towards the front, taking the lead in the back stretch of the final lap. The horse managed to hold off late-charging runners to record the unusual win by a head. The race announcer called the race the greatest win in the New Zealand Trotting Cup's history. At the time it was the second fastest New Zealand Cup, behind the 2008 win by Changeover.

The 2015 running of the New Zealand Cup was won by Australian-based horse, Arden Rooney, driven by Kerryn Manning. It was the first time in the history of the race that a female had driven the winner. After a great start, Arden Rooney was given a leisurely time in front and with a last half-mile in 55 seconds under a vigorous drive, gave little else a chance to catch it. Subsequently, the driver was given a two-week suspension and $1000 fine for "Excessive use of whip". It was her second fine for a similar offense in New Zealand within 8 days.

In 2016 the race was run and won by the dominant Purdon/Rasmussen training combination, with their champion horse Lazarus. It was won in a very fast time in completely dominant fashion by 10 lengths, running 3.53.1 for the 2-mile event (a mile rate of 1.57.2). The Purdon/Rasmussen combination filled 3 of the first 4 finishing positions. Lazarus returned to win the Cup the following year.

In 2016, the ZM Body Art final was held at the Trotting Cup.

New Zealand Cup day will generally attract over 20,000 people at the race course. However, in 2021 the crowd was unable to attend due to COVID-19 restrictions.

=== Stake money ===
The stake or total prize money for the New Zealand Cup has fluctuated over the years:

- 1940 – 2500 pounds
- 1950 – 7500 pounds
- 1960 – 6750 pounds
- 1970 - $25,000
- 1980 - $100,000
- 1990 - $375,000
- 2000 - $350,000
- 2008 - $1.2 million
- 2009 - $1 million
- 2010 - $750,000
- 2011 and 2012 - $600,000
- 2013 - $650,000
- 2020 - $540,000
- 2021 - $631,500
- 2023 - $789,375

== Records ==
Most wins:

- 3 - Terror To Love (2011, 2012, 2013)
- 3 - False Step (1958, 1959, 1960)
- 3 - Indianapolis (1934, 1935, 1936)

Most wins by a driver:

- 7 - Ricky May (1989, 1997, 2005, 2009, 2010, 2012, 2013)
- 6 - Cecil Devine (1951, 1956, 1958, 1959, 1960, 1979)
- 6 - Mark Purdon (1995, 1996, 2014, 2016, 2017, 2020)
- 4 - James "Scotty" Bryce (1916, 1925, 1926, 1933)
- 4 - Todd Mitchell (1999, 2002, 2003, 2004)
- 4 - Peter Wolfenden (1963, 1965, 1970, 1977)

== Race results ==
The following are the winners and place getters.

| Year | Horse | Age | Hcp | Owner(s) | Driver | Trainer(s) | Time | Second | Third |
|---|---|---|---|---|---|---|---|---|---|
| 2026 | Leap To Fame | 7 h | fr | Solid Earth Pty Ltd | Grant Dixon | Grant Dixon, Queensland | 3:56.6 | Marketplace | Tact McLeod |
| 2025 | Kingman | 4 h | fr | Mick Harvey | Luke McCarthy | Luke McCarthy | 3:54.8 | Leap To Fame | Merlin |
| 2024 | Swayzee | 6 g | fr | Boots Properties Racing Pty Ltd, L F Drake, N H Jackson, Jason R Grimson | Cameron Hart | Jason Grimson, New South Wales | 3:57.1 | Don't Stop Dreaming | Republican Party |
| 2023 | Swayzee | 5 g | fr | Boots Properties Racing Pty Ltd, L F Drake, N H Jackson, Jason R Grimson | Cameron Hart | Jason Grimson | 3:56.5 | Akuta | Beach Ball |
| 2022 | Copy That | 5 h | fr | Merv & Meg Butterworth | Blair Orange | Ray Green | 3:54.0 | Majestic Cruiser | Spankem |
| 2021 | Copy That | 4 h | fr | Merv & Meg Butterworth | Blair Orange | Ray Green | 3:58.8 | Self Assured | South Coast Arden |
| 2020 | Self Assured | 5 g | fr | Mrs Jean L Feiss | Mark Purdon | Mark Purdon & Natalie Rasmussen | 3:55.2 | Spankem | Ashley Locaz |
| 2019 | Cruz Bromac | 8 g | fr | D Zavitsanos, P M O’Shea, Mrs D O’Shea, Mrs J Zavitsanos, W R Viney | Blair Orange | Mark Purdon & Natalie Rasmussen | 3:56.9 | Spankem | Classie Brigade |
| 2018 | Thefixer | 5 g | fr | Mrs G J Kennard & P I Kennard, Mrs P P Gillan, R J Fleetwood, R J Magness | Natalie Rasmussen | Mark Purdon & Natalie Rasmussen | 3:53.9 | Tiger Tara | Dream About Me |
| 2017 | Lazarus | 5 h | fr | Mrs G J Kennard & P I Kennard, T Casey & K Riseley | Mark Purdon | Mark Purdon & Natalie Rasmussen | 3:55.0 | Jack's Legend | Tiger Tara |
| 2016 | Lazarus | 4 h | fr | Mrs G J Kennard & P I Kennard, T Casey & K Riseley | Mark Purdon | Mark Purdon & Natalie Rasmussen | 3:53.1 | Tiger Tara | Titan Banner |
| 2015 | Arden Rooney | 6 g | fr | M W (Merv) Butterworth & Mrs M T (Meg) Butterworth | Kerryn Manning | Kerryn Manning | 3:57.4 | Smolda | Mossdale Conner |
| 2014 | Adore Me | 5 m | fr | C J Roberts, P G Kenny & Mrs M L Kenny | Mark Purdon | Mark Purdon & Natalie Rasmussen | 3:54.6 | Franco Nelson | For A Reason |
| 2013 | Terror To Love | 6 h | fr | Terry McDonald | Ricky May | Graham & Paul Court | 3:57.0 | Fly Like An Eagle | Christen Me |
| 2012 | Terror To Love | 5 h | fr | Terry McDonald | Ricky May | Graham & Paul Court | 3:58.6 | Highview Tommy | Sushi Sushi |
| 2011 | Terror To Love | 4 h | fr | Terry McDonald | Jim Curtin | Graham & Paul Court | 4:02.0 | Smoken Up | Highview Tommy |
| 2010 | Monkey King * | 8 g | fr | Cavalla Bloodstock Limited | Ricky May | Brendon Hill | 4:00.7 | Smoken Up | Sleepy Tripp |
| 2009 | Monkey King * | 7 g | fr | Cavalla Bloodstock Limited | Ricky May | Brendon Hill | 3:57.3 | Bettor's Strike | Smoken Up |
| 2008 | Changeover | 5 h | fr | A.T.C. Trot 2006 Syndicate | David Butcher | Geoff Small | 3:56.4 | Baileys Dream | Report For Duty |
| 2007 | Flashing Red | 10 h | 15m | Ravelyn Pty Ltd, Jenkscraft Pty Ltd | Anthony Butt | Tim Butt & Phil Anderson | 3:57.8 | Monkey King | Tribute |
| 2006 | Flashing Red | 9 h | fr | Ravelyn Pty Ltd, Jenkscraft Pty Ltd | Anthony Butt | Tim Butt & Phil Anderson | 4:00.3 | Cobbity Classic | It's Ella |
| 2005 | Mainland Banner | 4 m | fr | Ian D Dobson, S J Dobson, Lynne Umar | Ricky May | Robert Dunn | 4:04.0 | Alta Serena | Just An Excuse |
| 2004 | Just An Excuse * | 6 g | 10m | O Haines, Mrs I K Haines | Todd Mitchell | Robert Mitchell | 4:01.2 | Elsu | Howard Bromac |
| 2003 | Just An Excuse | 5 g | fr | O Haines, Mrs I K Haines | Todd Mitchell | Robert Mitchell | 4:05.7 | Elsu | Jack Cade |
| 2002 | Gracious Knight | 6 g | fr | Happy Valley Syndicate | Todd Mitchell | Mike Berger & Warren Rich | 4:05.1 | Facta Non Verba | Shortys Girl |
| 2001 | Kym's Girl | 7 m | fr | G J Trist, D B Miller, W G Marra | Colin De Filippi | Colin & Julie DeFilippi | 4:05.4 | Homin Hosed | Yulestar |
| 2000 | Yulestar | 6 g | 10m | Mrs J L Nolan, R P Nolan | Tony Shaw | Lorraine Nolan | 3:59.1 | Bogan Fella | Kym's Girl |
| 1999 | Homin Hosed | 5 g | fr | Mrs M A Macey, B L Macey | Todd Mitchell | Bryan Macey | 4:04.3 | Holmes D G | Bogan Fella |
| 1998 | Christian Cullen * | 4 h | fr | Ian D Dobson, Mrs D A Dobson, B A O'Meara | Danny Campbell | Brian O'Meara | 4:00.4 | Iraklis | Franco Enforce |
| 1997 | Iraklis | 5 h | fr | R M Cameron, Kypros Kotzikas | Ricky May | Robert Cameron | 4:00.9 | Smooth Dominion | Sovereign Hill |
| 1996 | Il Vicolo | 5 h | 10m | J H Seaton, Mark Purdon | Mark Purdon | Mark Purdon | 4:02.3 | Anvil's Star | Surprise Package |
| 1995 | Il Vicolo * | 4 h | fr | J H Seaton, M Purdon | Mark Purdon | Mark Purdon | 4:00.4 | Just Royce | Master Musician |
| 1994 | Bee Bee Cee * | 5 h | fr | C J Calvert, Mrs J M Calvert | Jim Curtin | Colin Calvert | 4:01.5 | Master Musician | Matthew Lee |
| 1993 | Chokin * | 5 g | fr | Pacers Australia, M Joyce, J Loughnan, B De Boer | Tony Herlihy | Roy & Barry Purdon | 4:04.7 | Master Musician | Giovanetto |
| 1992 | Blossom Lady * | 8 m | fr | Polly Syndicate | Anthony Butt | Derek Jones | 4:05.0 | Giovanetto | Christopher Vance |
| 1991 | Christopher Vance * | 5 g | fr | R R Reid, Lorna Reid Syndicate, Mrs J C Reid | Tony Herlihy | Roy & Barry Purdon | 4:05.3 | Clancy | Surmo Way |
| 1990 | Neroship | 5 h | 10m | G J & Mrs. H J Webber, J W Langdon | John Langdon | John Langdon | 4:04.1 | Starship | Kylie's Hero |
| 1989 | Inky Lord | 4 h | fr | G M Saunders | Ricky May | Brian Saunders | 4:02.2 | Dillon Dean | Bold Sharvid |
| 1988 | Luxury Liner | 7 g | 10m | R R Reid, Lorna Reid Synd, Mrs J C Reid | Tony Herlihy | Roy & Barry Purdon | 4:00.4 | Our Maestro | Speedy Cheval |
| 1987 | Lightning Blue | 5 h | fr | N Conidi, A T Hunter, A Prochilo | Jim O'Sullivan | Jim O'Sullivan | 4:05.1 | Luxury Liner | Skipper Dale |
| 1986 | Master Mood * | 5 h | fr | K L & Mrs B A Williams, S F & F B Wong | Kevin Williams | Kevin Williams | 4:05.5 | Luxury Liner | Skipper Dale |
| 1985 | Borana | 6 h | Fr | J G Murray, Mrs D M Murray | Peter Jones | Peter Jones | 4:11.1 | Our Mana | Roydon Glen |
| 1984 | Camelot | 6 h | fr | Dr H G Crofts | Robin Butt | Robin Butt | 4:06.4 | Our Mana | Dillon Dale |
| 1983 | Steel Jaw | 5 g | fr | S Everett & O Marr | Norm Lang | Norm Lang | 4:05.3 | Camelot | Bonnie's Chance |
| 1982 | Bonnie's Chance | 7 m | fr | Mesdames K A Grice & V B McGarry | Richard Brosnan | Richard Brosnan | 4:09 | Armalight | Quiet Win |
| 1981 | Armalight * | 5 m | fr | H B Smith | Robert (Bob) Negus | Brent Smith | 4:08.7 | Bonnie's Chance | Hands Down |
| 1980 | Hands Down * | 5 g | fr | W H & Mrs M F McAughtrie | Peter Jones | Derek Jones | 4:07.2 | Delightful Lady | Sapling |
| 1979 | Lord Module * | 5 h | fr | Cecil Devine | Cecil Devine | Cecil Devine | 4:09 | Rocky Tryax | Trevira |
| 1978 | Trusty Scot * | 6 h | fr | A M & J H Hunter | J Henderson Hunter | J Henderson Hunter | 4:12.8 | Sapling | Rocky Tryax |
| 1977 | Sole Command | 6 g | fr | B J & Mrs M I Walker & R C Purdon | Peter Wolfenden | Roy & Barry Purdon | 4:11.4 | Greg Robinson | Wee Win |
| 1976 | Stanley Rio | 4 h | fr | W J Francis, G B & J B Noble | J B Noble | G B Noble | 4:11.5 | Captain Harcourt | Forto Prontezza |
| 1975 | Lunar Chance | 5 g | fr | K N Lawlor | K N Lawlor | K N Lawlor | 4:08.6 | Final Decision | Robalan |
| 1974 | Robalan * | 7 g | fr | A T Devery, P N Hope & Denis Nyhan | Denis Nyhan | Denis Nyhan | 4:09 | Kotare Legend | Young Quinn |
| 1973 | Arapaho | 6 g | fr | Laurie Forde | Jack Smolenski | Jack Smolenski | 4:08.6 | Globe Bay | Young Quinn |
| 1972 | Globe Bay | 6 g | fr | S J Wheatley | Jack Carmichael | Jack Carmichael | 4:11.6 | Scottish Charm | Robalan |
| 1971 | True Averil | 6 h | fr | Clarrie Rhodes | Doody Townley | Clarrie Rhodes | 4:11 | Radiant Globe | Intrepid |
| 1970 | James | 8 g | fr | Jim Donaldson | Peter Wolfenden | Jim Donaldson | 4:11.2 | Stella Frost | Manaroa |
| 1969 | Spry * | 7 h | fr | Mrs & Charlie A Winter | Pat G O'Reilly | Charlie Winter | 4:15.2 | Holy Hal | Chequer Board |
| 1968 | Humphrey | 7 g | 6 yds | Mrs & W E (Ted) Lowe | W E (Ted) Lowe | W E (Ted) Lowe | 4:16 | Cardinal Garrison | Co-pilot |
| 1967 | Great Adios | 8 h | fr | Mrs P M Norton | Ray Norton | Ray Norton | 4:10.4 | Happy Ending | Spry |
| 1966 | Lordship | 8 h | 42 yds | Mrs Doris Nyhan | Denis Nyhan | D G (Don) Nyhan | 4:19 | Robin Dundee | Waitaki Hanover |
| 1965 | Garry Dillon | 7 g | fr | E B S Grey & J H Shaw | Peter Wolfenden | J P Baker | 4:22.4 | Robin Dundee | Jacobite |
| 1964 | Cairnbrae | 8 g | fr | W E (Ted) Lowe | C S Donald | C S Donald | 4:12.6 | Orbiter | Lordship |
| 1963 | Cardigan Bay * | 7 g | 54 yds | Mrs A D Deans | Peter Wolfenden | Peter Wolfenden | 4:11.2 | Robin Dundee | Master Alan |
| 1962 | Lordship * | 4 h | fr | Mrs Doris Nyhan | Denis Nyhan | D G (Don) Nyhan | 4:24 | Falsehood | Blue Prince |
| 1961 | Invicta | 11 g | fr | Les Duff | S D (Steve) Edge | S D (Steve) Edge | 4:14.4 | Patchwork | Scottish Command |
| 1960 | False Step * | 8 h | 48 yds | J Smyth | Cecil Devine | Cecil Devine | 4:09 | Sun Chief | Lookaway |
| 1959 | False Step | 7 h | 24 yds | J Smyth | Cecil Devine | Cecil Devine | 4:12.8 | Gentry | Caduceus |
| 1958 | False Step | 6 h | fr | J Smyth | Cecil Devine | Cecil Devine | 4:18.6 | Caduceus | Gentry |
| 1957 | Lookaway * | 4 g | fr | Clarrie Rhodes | Maurice Holmes | Maurice Holmes | 4:14.8 | Thunder | La Mignon |
| 1956 | Thunder | 7 g | fr | Erick & Est G L Rutherford | Cecil Devine | Cecil Devine | 4:21.8 | Laureldale | Caduceus |
| 1955 | Our Roger | 8 g | 12 yds | W A Newton | Doug C Watts | Jack Litten | 4:12.2 | Rupee | Excelsa |
| 1954 | Johnny Globe * | 7 h | 48 yds | D G (Don) Nyhan | D G (Don) Nyhan | D G (Don) Nyhan | 4:07.6 | Young Charles | Rupee |
| 1953 | Adorian | 6 h | 12 yds | F G Holmes | F G Holmes | F G Holmes | 4:13.8 | Johnny Globe | Soangetaha |
| 1952 | Mobile Globe | 8 g | 12 yds | J Findlay & C Smith | Noel Berkett | Noel Berkett | 4:26.4 | Tactician | Van Dieman |
| 1951 | Van Dieman | 5 h | fr | Cecil Devine | Cecil Devine | Cecil Devine | 4:19.8 | Johnny Globe | Young Charles |
| 1950 | Chamfer | 5 h | fr | D McFarlane | Maurice Holmes | Maurice Holmes | 4:17 | Plunder Bar | Single Direct |
| 1949 | Loyal Nurse | 9 m | 36 yds | T S Harrison | Colin Berkett | Colin Berkett | 4:12.2 | Captain Sandy | Lady Averil |
| 1948 | Highland Fling * | 6 h | 60 yds | Alf Kemble | Leo Berkett | Leo Berkett | 4:10.6 | Plunder Bar | Single Direct |
| 1947 | Highland Fling | 5 h | 12 yds | Alf Kemble | Colin Berkett | Leo Berkett | 4:18.4 | Knave Of Diamonds | Loyal Peter |
| 1946 | Integrity | 8 g | 12 yds | Vic Leeming | Doug C Watts | Vic Leeming | 4:21.4 | Josedale Grattan | Haughty |
| 1945 | Gold Bar | 9 h | fr | Allan B Holmes | Allan B Holmes | Allan B Holmes | 4:16.2 | Integrity | Shadow Maid |
| 1944 | Bronze Eagle | 8 h | 24 yds | W J Suttie | George B Noble | Roy Berry | 4:27.8 | Integrity | Pacing Power |
| 1943 | Haughty | 8 m | 36 yds | Ben Grice | O E (Ossie) Hooper | Ben Grice | 4:13.6 | Countless | Pacing Power |
| 1942 | Haughty | 7 m | fr | Ben Grice | O E (Ossie) Hooper | Ben Grice | 4:13.8 | Loyal Rey | Bayard |
| 1941 | Josedale Grattan * | 6 h | fr | M G Pezaro & E G Bridgens | Fred J Smith | Fred J Smith | 4:15 | Kenworthy | Peter Smith |
| 1940 | Marlene | 7 m | fr | Ces S Donald | R Donald | Ces S Donald | 4:18.6 | Dusky Sound | Colonel Grattan |
| 1939 | Lucky Jack | 7 h | 24 yds | W T (Bill) Lowe | Roy Berry | Roy Berry, Yaldhurst | 4:16.2 | Cantata | Blair Athol |
| 1938 | Morello | 9 g | fr | A J Lawrence | Maurice C McTigue | Maurice C McTigue, Methven | 4:19.8 | Lucky Jack | Logan Derby |
| 1937 | Lucky Jack | 5 h | fr | W T (Bill) Lowe | Roy Berry | Roy Berry, Yaldhurst | 4:21.4 | Gamble | Tempest |
| 1936 | Indianapolis | 7 h | 48 yds | George J Barton | Jack Fraser jnr | F Claude Dunleavy, Addington | 4:30.6 | Red Shadow | War Buoy |
| 1935 | Indianapolis | 6 h | 48 yds | George J Barton | Jack Fraser jnr | F Claude Dunleavy, Addington | 4:44.00 | War Buoy | Red Shadow |
| 1934 | Indianapolis | 5 h | 12 yds | George J Barton | Eugene C McDermott | F Claude Dunleavy, Addington | 4:15.8 | Blue Mountain | Harold Logan |
| 1933 | Red Shadow * | 6 h | 24 yds | Mrs Margaret Harrall | James "Scotty" Bryce | J Bryce, Hornby | 4:24.2 | Royal Silk | Mountain Dell |
| 1932 | Harold Logan * | 10 g | 60 yds | Miss Effie Hinds | Allan B Holmes | R J (Dick) Humphries, Templeton | 4:16.4 | Glenrossie | Roi l'Or |
| 1931 | Harold Logan * | 9 g | 48 yds | Miss Effie Hinds | R J (Dick) Humphreys | R J (Dick) Humphries, Templeton | 4:18.4 | Kingcraft | Free Advice |
| 1930 | Wrackler | 5 g | 12 yds | Harry Nicoll | Maurice Holmes | Don Warren, Ashburton | 4:24.2 | Author Jinks | Jewel Pointer |
| 1929 | Peter Bingen | 9 h | 36 yds | Wilfred Johnstone | Jack J Kennerley | Jack J Kennerley, Te Awamutu | 4:18.8 | Logan Park | Dundas Boy |
| 1928 | Peter Bingen * | 8 h | 12 yds | Jack J Kennerley | Jack J Kennerley | Jack J Kennerley, Addington | 4:22.2 | Great Bingen | Ahuriri |
| 1927 | Kohara | 6 h | 24 yds | J L Webb | Andrew Bryce | J Bryce, Hornby | 4:46.6 | Cardinal Logan | Man O' War |
| 1926 | Ahuriri | 7 h | 24 yds | R M Morten | James "Scotty" Bryce | J Bryce, Hornby | 4:25 | Prince Pointer | Talaro |
| 1925 | Ahuriri | 6 h | 12 yds | R M Morten | James "Scotty" Bryce | J Bryce, Hornby | 4:28.2 | Great Bingen | Acron |
| 1924 | Sheik | 7 h | 36 yds | Peter Riddle | Peter Riddle | Peter Riddle, Sydney | 4:25.8 | Great Hope | Taraire |
| 1923 | Great Hope | 5 h | 12 yds | J Trengrove | James Bryce jnr | J Bryce, Hornby | 4:31.4 | Acron | Onyx |
| 1922 | Agathos | 11 g | 12 yds | C M Ollivier (listed as C M Channing) | Artie Butterfield | N C Price, Sockburn | 4:33.4 | Logan Pointer | Vilo |
| 1921 | Reta Peter (T) | 8 m | 7 secs | Francis H Robson | A G Wilson | | 4:29 | Sherwood (1st dsq relegated) | Vice Admiral |
| 1920 | Reta Peter (T) | 7 m | 9 secs | Francis H Robson | A G Wilson | A G Wilson | 4:30.4 | General Link | Author Dillon |
| 1919 | Trix Pointer | 6 m | 6 secs | W H Norton | Free Holmes | Free Holmes | 4:30 | Moneymaker | Match Light |
| 1918 | Author Dillon * | 6 h | 3 secs | Ben Jarden | Ben Jarden | Ben Jarden | 4:26.4 | Match Light | Sungod |
| 1917 | Adelaide Direct | 10 m | 7 secs | Manny Edwards | Manny Edwards | Manny Edwards | 4:27.8 | Cathedral Chimes | Author Dillon |
| 1916 | Cathedral Chimes | 5 h | 36 yds | J B Thomson | James "Scotty" Bryce | James "Scotty" Bryce | 4:31.2 | Evelyn | Admiral Wood |
| 1915 | Country Belle | 7 m | scr | W J Morland | A Hendricksen | W J Morland | 4:35.6 | Our Thorpe | Jingle |
| 1914 | Win Soon | 7 m | 6 secs | Mr. Stevenson, Mr. McMath | A Pringle | A Pringle | 4:31 | Country Belle | Eccentric |
| 1913 | Ravenschild | 7 h | 6 secs | J McCutcheon | N L Price | N L Price | 4:35.4 | Denver Huon | Calm |
| 1912 | Albert H | 7 h | 8 secs | M Maher | A Hendricksen | A Hendricksen | 4:48.8 | Ravenschild | Glendalough |
| 1911 | Lady Clare | 6 m | 4 secs | W F Clinton | J Brankin | J Tasker | 4:38 | Prince Imperial | Dick Fly |
| 1910 | Wildwood Junior | 6 h | scr | W Kerr | W Kerr | W Kerr | 4:33 | Bright | Ribbons |
| 1909 | Wildwood Junior | 5 h | 5 secs | W Kerr | W Kerr | W Kerr | 4:39 | Terra Nova | Lord Elmo |
| 1908 | Durbar | 12 g | scr | H F Nicoll | A Pringle | A Pringle | 4:36 | Terra Nova | Lord Elmo |
| 1907 | Marian | 8 m | 9 secs | S E Tasker | J Tasker | J Tasker | 5:16.4 | Advance | Verax |
| 1906 | Belmont M | 6 h | 4 secs | J Mills | A G (Gus) Milsom | A G (Gus) Milsom, Sydney | 4:46 | Euchre | Marian |
| 1905 | Birchmark | 5 g | 7 secs | Allendale Stock Farm Co. | David J Price | Lou Robertson, Melbourne | 5:17.6 | General Lincoln | Vickery |
| 1904 | Monte Carlo (T) | 14 g | 7 secs | Tom Yarr | Bert Edwards | Bert Edwards, Woodend | 4:44.4 | Norice | Durbar |

* won the New Zealand Free For All same year

== Other associated races ==
The horses that contest the New Zealand Cup often compete in various traditional lead in races held in the South Island. The winner of the New Zealand Cup was usually one that wins or performs strongly in these races. However, in recent years the New Zealand Cup winners have not entered the lead in races.

On the Friday following the New Zealand Cup, Canterbury Anniversary day, many of the same horses will contest the New Zealand Free For All.

| Year | Hannon Memorial (2600m) Oamaru | Canterbury Classic (2600m) Addington | Ashburton Flying Stakes (2400m) Ashburton | Kaikoura Cup (2400m) Kaikoura | New Zealand Cup (3200m) Addington | New Zealand Free For All (1609m) Addington | Notes |
|---|---|---|---|---|---|---|---|
| 2026 | Franco Sinatra (8th in NZ Cup) | Bettors Anvil (11th in NZ Cup) | The Lazarus Effect (13th in NZ Cup) | Captains Mistress (DNS in NZ Cup) | Leap To Fame | Captains Mistress (DNS in NZ Cup) | |
| 2025 | Akuta (8th in NZ Cup) | Republican Party (6th in NZ Cup) | Republican Party (6th in NZ Cup) | Merlin (3rd in NZ Cup) | Kingman | Leap To Fame (2nd in NZ Cup) | Kingman did not race in NZ prior to the Cup |
| 2024 | Republican Party (3rd in NZ Cup) | Tact McLeod (7th in NZ Cup) | Merlin (4th in NZ Cup) | Mo'unga (6th in NZ Cup) | Swayzee | Merlin (4th in NZ Cup) | Swayzee did not race in NZ prior to the Cup |
| 2023 | Aardie's Express (DNS in NZ Cup) | Republican Party (5th in NZ Cup) | Akuta (2nd in NZ Cup) | Akuta (2nd in NZ Cup) | Swayzee | Self Assured (DNS in NZ Cup) | Swayzee did not race in NZ prior to the Cup |
| 2022 | Akuta (4th in NZ Cup) | B D Joe (8th in NZ Cup) | B D Joe (8th in NZ Cup) | Kango (10th in NZ Cup) | Copy That | Self Assured (5th in NZ Cup) | Copy That raced in Auckland, Australia and Cambridge prior to the NZ Cup |
| 2021 | Henry Hubert (13th in NZ Cup) | South Coast Arden (3rd in NZ Cup) | Self Assured (2nd in NZ Cup) | Classie Brigade (5th in NZ Cup) | Copy That | South Coast Arden (3rd in NZ Cup) | Copy That raced in Auckland, Australia and Cambridge prior to the NZ Cup |
| 2020 | Classie Brigade (6th in NZ Cup) | Self Assured | Copy That (8th in NZ Cup) (Self Assured 2nd) | Classie Brigade (6th in NZ Cup) | Self Assured | Spankem (2nd in NZ Cup) | |
| 2019 | Spankem (2nd in NZ Cup) | Spankem (2nd in NZ Cup) | Spankem (2nd in NZ Cup) | Classie Brigade (3rd in NZ Cup) | Cruz Bromac | Chase Auckland (4th in NZ Cup) | |
| 2018 | Dream About Me (3rd in NZ Cup) | Dream About Me (3rd in NZ Cup) | Eamon Maguire (5th in NZ Cup) | Spankem (DNS in NZ Cup) | Thefixer | Cruz Bromac (4th in NZ Cup) | |
| 2017 | Titan Banner (9th in NZ Cup) | Lazarus | Lazarus | Lazarus | Lazarus | Ultimate Machete (DNS in NZ Cup) | Lazarus won the 2017 Interdominion final |
| 2016 | Franco Nelson (6th in NZ Cup) | Lazarus | Lazarus | Franco Nelson (6th in NZ Cup) | Lazarus | Lazarus | |
| 2015 | Mighty Flying Mac (12th in NZ Cup) | Tiger Tara (6th in NZ Cup) | Smolda (2nd in NZ Cup) | Arden Rooney | Arden Rooney | Tiger Tara (6th in NZ Cup) | |
| 2014 | Tiger Tara (6th in NZ Cup) | Terror To Love (4th in NZ Cup) (Adore Me 6th) | Adore Me | Arden Rooney (12th in NZ Cup) | Adore Me | Christen Me (5th in NZ Cup) | |
| 2013 | Franco Ledger (6th in NZ Cup) | Christen Me (3rd in NZ Cup) (Terror To Love 2nd) | Terror To Love | Fly Like An Eagle (2nd in NZ Cup) | Terror To Love | Pembrook Benny (4th in NZ Cup) | |
| 2012 | Franco Ledger (8th in NZ Cup) | Gold Ace (11th in NZ Cup) (Terror To Love 2nd) | Terror To Love | Sushi Sushi (3rd in NZ Cup) | Terror To Love | Gold Ace (11th in NZ Cup) | |
| 2011 | Monkey King (7th in NZ Cup) | Terror To Love | Auckland Reactor (DNS in NZ Cup) | Smiling Shard (9th in NZ Cup) | Terror To Love | Smoken Up (2nd in NZ Cup) | |
| 2010 | Cullen's Creek (DNS in NZ Cup) | Monkey King | Stunnin Cullen (7th in NZ Cup) | Smiling Shard (DNS in NZ Cup) | Monkey King | Monkey King | |
| 2009 | Bondy (DNS in NZ Cup) | Monkey King | Karloo Mick (6th in NZ Cup) | Nearea Franco (13th in NZ Cup) | Monkey King | Monkey King | |
| 2008 | Ohoka Rebel (11th in NZ Cup) | Tribute (9th in NZ Cup) | Baileys Dream (2nd in NZ Cup) | Report For Duty (3rd in NZ Cup) | Changeover | Auckland Reactor (DNS in NZ Cup) | |
| 2007 | Baileys Dream (7th in NZ Cup) | Classic Cullen (11th in NZ Cup) (Flashing Red 5th) | Tribute (3rd in NZ Cup) | Bondy (6th in NZ Cup) | Flashing Red | Waipawa Lad (9th in NZ Cup) | |
| 2006 | The Flyin Doctor (13th in NZ Cup) | Winforu (Disq in NZ Cup) (Flashing Red 6th) | Flashing Red | Tribute (7th in NZ Cup) | Flashing Red | Sly Flyin (6th in NZ Cup) | |
| 2005 | Bobs Blue Boy (4th in NZ Cup) | White Arrow (14th in NZ Cup) | Harnetts Creek (8th in NZ Cup) | Imagine That (DNS in NZ Cup) | Mainland Banner | Howard Bromac (6th in NZ Cup) | |
| 2004 | Mister D G (4th in NZ Cup) | Mister D G (4th in NZ Cup) | Elsu (2nd in NZ Cup) | Harnetts Creek (5th in NZ Cup) | Just An Excuse | Just An Excuse | |
| 2003 | Jack Cade (3rd in NZ Cup) | Jack Cade (3rd in NZ Cup) | Jack Cade (3rd in NZ Cup) | Falcon Rise (8th in NZ Cup) | Just An Excuse | Jack Cade (3rd in NZ Cup) | |
| 2002 | Panky's Pacer (DNF in NZ Cup) | Stars And Stripes (5th in NZ Cup) | Young Rufus (6th in NZ Cup) | Disprove (9th in NZ Cup) | Gracious Knight | Yulestar (7th in NZ Cup) | |
| 2001 | Kym's Girl | Pic Me Pockets (7th in NZ Cup) | Panky's Pacer (DNS in NZ Cup) | Pic Me Pockets (7th in NZ Cup) | Kym's Girl | Young Rufus (DNS in NZ Cup) | |
| 2000 | Chloe Hanover (8th in NZ Cup) | The Tough Nut (13th in NZ Cup) | Yulestar | Bogan Fella (2nd in NZ Cup) | Yulestar | Agua Caliente (DNS in NZ Cup) | Yulestar also won the 2001 Inter Dominion final |
| 1999 | Freeway Don (DNS in NZ Cup) | | Holmes D G (2nd in NZ Cup) | Ritchi (11th in NZ Cup) | Homin Hosed | Holmes D G (2nd in NZ Cup) | |
| 1998 | Iraklis (2nd in NZ Cup) | | Christian Cullen | Bradshaw (DNS in NZ Cup) | Christian Cullen | Christian Cullen | |
| 1997 | Iraklis | | Iraklis | Sharp And Telford (12th in NZ Cup) | Iraklis | Brabham (5th in NZ Cup) | |
| 1996 | Anvil's Star (2nd in NZ Cup) | | Hoppy's Jet (13th in NZ Cup) | Il Vicolo | Il Vicolo | Iraklis (DNS in NZ Cup) | |
| 1995 | Burlington Bertie (11th in NZ Cup) | | Burlington Bertie (11th in NZ Cup) | Il Vicolo | Il Vicolo | Il Vicolo | |
| 1994 | Bee Bee Cee | | Master Musician (2nd in NZ Cup) | Franco Whisper (8th in NZ Cup) | Bee Bee Cee | Bee Bee Cee | |
| 1993 | Blossom Lady (4th in NZ Cup) | | not raced | Master Musician (2nd in NZ Cup) | Chokin | Chokin | |
| 1992 | Giovanetto (2nd in NZ Cup) | | Millie's Brother (7th in NZ Cup) | Master Musician (8th in NZ Cup) | Blossom Lady | Blossom Lady | |
| 1991 | Clancy (2nd in NZ Cup) | | Blossom Lady (13th in NZ Cup) | Starship (9th in NZ Cup) | Christopher Vance | Christopher Vance | |
| 1990 | Blossom Lady (5th in NZ Cup) | | Twinkle John (9th in NZ Cup) | Tight Connection (8th in NZ Cup) | Neroship | Tight Connection (8th in NZ Cup) | |
| 1989 | Inky Lord | | Starship (8th in NZ Cup) | Gina Rosa (9th in NZ Cup) | Inky Lord | Dillon Dean (2nd in NZ Cup) | |
| 1988 | Bionic Chance (DNS in NZ Cup) | | Master Mood (7th in NZ Cup) | Final Offer (9th in NZ Cup) | Luxury Liner | Tax Credit (14th in NZ Cup) | |
| 1987 | Sossy (4th in NZ Cup) | | Happy Sunrise (11th in NZ Cup) | Michele Bromac (DNS in NZ Cup) | Lightning Blue | Luxury Liner (2nd in NZ Cup) | |
| 1986 | Skipper Dale (3rd in NZ Cup) | | Skipper Dale (3rd in NZ Cup) | Spry Joker (6th in NZ Cup) | Master Mood | Master Mood | |
| 1985 | Roydon Glen (3rd in NZ Cup) | | Roydon Glen (3rd in NZ Cup) | Spry Joker (14th in NZ Cup) | Borana | Preux Chevalier (14th in NZ Cup) | |
| 1984 | Enterprise (Fell, DNF in NZ Cup) | | Enterprise (Fell, DNF in NZ Cup) | Diamond Moose (Fell, DNF in NZ Cup) | Camelot | Dillon Dale (3rd in NZ Cup) | |
| 1983 | Derby (6th in NZ Cup) | | Derby (6th in NZ Cup) | Diamond Moose (DNS in NZ Cup) | Steel Jaw | Camelot (2nd in NZ Cup) | |
| 1982 | Bonnie's Chance | | Vita Man (DNS in NZ Cup) | Armalight (2nd in NZ Cup) | Bonnie's Chance | Bonnie's Chance | |
| 1981 | Idolmite (4th in NZ Cup) | | El Regale (10th in NZ Cup) | Hands Down (3rd in NZ Cup) | Armalight | Armalight | |
| 1980 | Idolmite (11th in NZ Cup) | | Wee Win (6th in NZ Cup) | Sun Seeker (7th in NZ Cup) | Hands Down | Hands Down | |
| 1979 | Watbro (DNS in NZ Cup) | | Bad Luck (4th in NZ Cup) | Bad Luck (4th in NZ Cup) | Lord Module | Lord Module | |
| 1978 | Roydon Scott (DNS in NZ Cup) | | Trusty Scot | Trusty Scot | Trusty Scot | Trusty Scot | |
| 1977 | Palestine (6th in NZ Cup) | | Balgove (4th in NZ Cup) | Palestine (6th in NZ Cup) | Sole Command | Balgove (4th in NZ Cup) | |
| 1976 | Palestine (9th in NZ Cup) | | Mighty Gay (7th in NZ Cup) | Final Curtain (5th in NZ Cup) | Stanley Rio | Master Dean (10th in NZ Cup) | |
| 1975 | Kawarau Gold (7th in NZ Cup) | | Noodlum (DNS in NZ Cup) | Micron (8th in NZ Cup) | Lunar Chance | Lunar Chance | |
| 1974 | Hakim (11th in NZ Cup) | | Kotare Legend (2nd in NZ Cup) | Game Lad (DNS in NZ Cup) | Robalan | Robalan | |
| 1973 | Dreamy Morn (DNS in NZ Cup) | | Vanadium (6th in NZ Cup) | Royal Ascot (5th in NZ Cup) | Arapaho | Robalan (4th in NZ Cup) | |
| 1972 | Royal Ascot (8th in NZ Cup) | | Robalan (3rd in NZ Cup) | Royal Belmer (4th in NZ Cup) | Globe Bay | Robalan (3rd in NZ Cup) | |
| 1971 | Wag (DNS in NZ Cup) | | Valencia (6th in NZ Cup) | Intrepid (3rd in NZ Cup) | True Averil | Bay Foyle (4th in NZ Cup) | |
| 1970 | Intrepid (7th in NZ Cup) | | Rhinegolde (15th in NZ Cup) | Manaroa (3rd in NZ Cup) | James | Stella Frost (2nd in NZ Cup) | |

- DNS = Did not start
- DNF = Started race but did not finish (pulled up)
- Disq = Disqualified

== Top horses who did not win the New Zealand Cup ==
The list of New Zealand Cup winners includes many of the best horses New Zealand has produced as well as some great Australian horses. However, some very distinguished horses that have attempted but failed to win the Cup include:

- Auckland Reactor, the 2009 Auckland Cup winner.
- Caduceus, runner up to False Step in 1958 and 3rd to Thunder and False Step in 1956 and 1959. Won the 1954 Auckland Cup, the New Zealand Free For All in 1956, 1958 & 1959 and the 1960 Inter Dominion Pacing Championship before carrying on his career in the USA.
- Delightful Lady, runner up in 1980 to Hands Down. Delightful Lady won the Auckland Cup in 1980 and 1981.
- Elsu, runner up to Just An Excuse in 2003 and 2004. Elsu won the Auckland Pacing Cup twice and the Inter Dominion Pacing Championship in 2005.
- Master Musician, runner up in 1993 and 1994 and 3rd in 1995. Master Musician was the 1992 Auckland Cup winner.
- Our Mana, runner up in 1984 and 1985 to Camelot and Borana respectively.
- Robin Dundee, runner up in 1963 (behind Cardigan Bay), 1965 (Garry Dillon) and 1966 (Lordship). Robin Dundee was the winner of the 1965 Auckland Pacing Cup and 1st equal in the 1965 Inter Dominion Pacing Championship at Forbury Park.
- Roydon Glen, the 1985 Auckland Pacing Cup winner.
- Smoken Up, 3rd in 2009 and runner up in 2010 and 2011. Smoken Up was the 2010 and 2011 Miracle Mile Pace winner.
- Stella Frost, first past the post in the 1970 Cup but lost it on protest. She won the 1970 Auckland Pacing Cup and 1971 Inter Dominion Pacing Championship after Junior’s Image from Western Australia returned a positive swab.
- Tiger Tara, runner up in 2016 and 2018 and 3rd in 2017. Tiger Tara won the 2015 New Zealand Free For All, 2018 Victoria Cup and Inter Dominion Pacing Championship and the 2019 A G Hunter Cup.
- Young Quinn, 3rd in 1973 and 1974. Young Quinn was the winner of the 1974 Auckland Cup, 1975 Inter Dominion Pacing Championship and American Pacing Classic.

== See also ==
- Auckland Trotting Cup
- Dominion Handicap
- Great Northern Derby
- Inter Dominion Pacing Championship
- Inter Dominion Trotting Championship
- Miracle Mile Pace
- New Zealand Free For All
- New Zealand Messenger
- New Zealand Trotting Derby
- Noel J Taylor Mile
- Rowe Cup
- The Race by betcha
- Harness racing in New Zealand
