= Christian Cullen (horse) =

New Zealand Standardbred racehorse

- Breed: Standardbred
- Sire: In The Pocket
- Grandsire: Direct Scooter
- Dam: Pleasant Franco
- Damsire: Bo Scots Blue Chip
- Sex: Stallion
- Foaled: 6 November 1994
- Country: New Zealand
- Color: Bay
- Breeder: P R Bielby
- Owner: Ian Dobson
- Trainer: Brian O'Meara
- Record: 31:22–2–2
- Earnings: $1,249,150

Major wins
- New Zealand Sires Stakes 3yo Final (1997); New Zealand Trotting Cup (1998); New Zealand Free For All (1998); Miracle Mile Pace (1998); Treuer Memorial (1998); Auckland Pacing Cup (1998)

Awards
- 4-Year Old Pacer of the Year, Pacer of the Year & Harness Horse of the Year (1998/99)

Honors
- New Zealand Trotting Hall of Fame; Leading Standardbred Sire in New Zealand 2005/06 & 2007/08-2010/11; Leading Standardbred Sire in Australia 2010/11
- Last updated on 2016-02-02

Christian Cullen (foaled 6 November 1994) is a Standardbred stallion and was one of New Zealand's best pacers. Named after the New Zealand international rugby union player, Christian Cullen, he won 22 of his 31 starts, and $NZ1,249,150 in prize money. He is notable in that he won both the Auckland Pacing Cup and New Zealand Trotting Cup races, the richest harness races in New Zealand. A powerful and impressive stallion, he has been particularly successful at stud.

He is best known for his season as a four-year-old in 1998–99, when he won all of his 12 starts, including the New Zealand Trotting Cup, Auckland Cup and the Miracle Mile Pace. This led to him being crowned Horse of the Year in New Zealand. He was retired from racing in February 2000 and became the leading pacing sire in Australasia, siring the New Zealand Cup winners Mainland Banner among others.

== Early racing career ==
As a two-year-old Christian Cullen won all of his five starts and $152,465. He won the Welcome Stakes and Sales Series Pace but his season was shortened by injury.

In the 1997–98 season Christian Cullen won 5 of 10 starts with 2 seconds and 1 third, and he earned $302,460. In November he won the New Zealand Sires Stakes 3yo Final and then beat older pacers in the $100,000 Round Up 1950 in a 1.58.1 mile rate over 1950 metres with a final 800 metres in 55.9 seconds. Christian Cullen then received an invitation to the Miracle Mile Pace in Sydney but was a late scratching due to a pre-race testing irregularity, however the control fluid was later found to be contaminated. Back in New Zealand he was an unlucky third to Holmes D G in the Great Northern Derby and won the Sales Series Pace but suffered an injury before the New Zealand Derby.

== 1998–99 season ==
Having recovered from injury Christian Cullen won several races early in the season including the Ashburton Flying Stakes where he beat Iraklis and became favourite for the New Zealand Trotting Cup. He was unofficially timed to have run the final mile of the race in 1:53.5. Christian Cullen then won the New Zealand Cup beating Iraklis with seven lengths to the third placed horse. The time of 4:00.4 equalled the race record. Three days later he won the New Zealand Free For All defeating Holmes D G running his last 800 metres in 54.4 seconds. Invited back to Sydney for the Miracle Mile Pace Christian Cullen won by 20 metres over Tailamade Lombo and Our Sir Vancelot in a mile rate of 1:54.4 for 1760 metres. He then displayed courage to win the Treuer Memorial at Bankstown in track record time. In the Auckland Pacing Cup Christian Cullen cruised home in 3:59.7 for 3200 metres but missed the Victoria Cup in Melbourne after suffering pneumonia. Christian Cullen then won two races at Cambridge Raceway including the Waikato Flying Mile where he won easily in 1:54.2 but did not attempt to break the national mile record due to the closeness of the upcoming Inter Dominion. He won an opening night heat of the Inter Dominion, for which he was even money favourite before the series had even begun, but suffered a leg injury which ended his season.

== 1999–2000 season ==
Christian Cullen returned to the track as a five year in the Hannon Memorial but was unplaced. He then suffered from corns which kept him out of racing for several months. He won in 1:55.9 over a mile at Moonee Valley and was eighth in the A G Hunter Cup after being severely checked at the start. Christian Cullen’s final start came when he was third to Breeny’s Fella and Shakamaker in the Victoria Cup as 1/2 favourite. He was found to have a cough but also a leg injury which ended his racetrack career and he was retired to Wai Eyre Stud.

== Stud career ==
It was announced in 2013 that he would move to Nevele R Stud. At the time progeny of Christian Cullen had earned $50 million in stakes and as of October 2015 they have won over $75m.

His progeny includes the following:

- Christen Me, winner of the 2014 Miracle Mile Pace.
- Gotta Go Cullen, winner of the 2008 Auckland Pacing Cup.
- Mainland Banner, winner of the 2005 New Zealand Trotting Cup.
- Stunin Cullen, winner of the 2011 A G Hunter Cup.

He has also sired numerous Derby and Oaks winners. He has been the leading sire in both New Zealand and Australia and his service fee at one time reached NZ$25,000.

He is also the maternal grand sire of Lazarus and Self Assured.

He retired to the Dancingonmoonlight farm north of Christchurch.

== Major race wins ==
- 1997 New Zealand Sires Stakes 3yo Final
- 1998 Auckland Pacing Cup, beating Bogan Fella and Kate’s First
- 1998 Miracle Mile Pace
- 1998 Ashburton Flying Stakes
- 1998 New Zealand Trotting Cup, beating Iraklis and Franco Enforce
- 1998 New Zealand Free For All

== See also ==
- Harness racing in New Zealand
