= Mark Purdon =

New Zealand standardbred racehorse trainer and driver

Mark Purdon is a driver and trainer of standardbred racehorses in New Zealand. He was associated with many champions and is one of the leading trainers and drivers of harness horses in New Zealand and Australasia. He was inducted into the Inter Dominion Hall of Fame.

Mark has trained on his own account and in partnership as follows:

- 1998–2007 as a sole trainer.
- 2008–2012 with Grant Payne.
- 2013 – sole trainer.
- 2014 - 31/12/2020 - with Natalie Rasmussen.
- 2021 - 2022 with Hayden Cullen.
- 2023 - with Nathan Purdon.

In mid November 2020, Mark Purdon and Natalie Rasmussen announced they would cease their training partnership as from 31 December 2020. They would lease their Rolleston stables to Hayden and Amanda Cullen and although staying involved, when required, they would not be managing the day to day training operation. Mark (aged 56 years old) and Natalie (43) intended to take a break after working with horses for a combined 70 years. Their last night as a partnership was the December 2020 Auckland Pacing Cup meeting at Alexandra Park in which they managed to quinella the Cup with Amazing Dream and Spankem.

From 1 October 2021 Purdon officially returned to the formal training ranks again and joined Hayden Cullen in partnership. It was also announced Natalie Rasmussen will then re-join him in fulltime training from 1 January 2022, replacing Cullen who would revert to being stable foreman again. However, from 2021 to 2022 the partnership was Purdon and Cullen.

From 1 January 2023 Hayden Cullen left to join in partnership with Steve and Amanda Telfer. Mark then commenced training in partnership with his son, Nathan Purdon, who had previously operated from Victoria, Australia and had previously trained in partnership with Cran and Chrissey Dalgety in 2020 and 2021 respectively.

Mark Purdon announced in 2023 that he was going to try thoroughbred racing. He bought three thoroughbred yearlings at the Karaka sales and planned to engage Canterbury trainer Danny Frye to break in his horses.

== Notable horses ==
Top horses Mark has been associated with, and races they have won, include:

Horse	Races
Adore Me	2014 New Zealand Trotting Cup
Akuta	2022 New Zealand Trotting Derby, 2023 Noel J Taylor Memorial Mile and Auckland Cup
Amazing Dream	2020 Auckland Pacing Cup
Auckland Reactor	2009 Auckland Trotting Cup
Cruz Bromac	2019 New Zealand Trotting Cup
Don't Stop Dreaming	2022 The Crossing Ace of Spades (2YO Colts & Geldings) Mobile Pace
Dream About Me	2016 Auckland Trotting Cup
High Energy	2022 Canterbury Spa & Pool Ace of Hearts (2YO fillies) Mobile Trot
I Can Doosit (trotter)	2011 & 2012 Inter Dominion Trotting Championship, 2011 & 2012 Rowe Cup, 2012 Dominion Handicap
Il Vicolo	1995 & 1996 New Zealand Trotting Cup
Jack Cade	2003 New Zealand Free For All
Lazarus	2016 & 2017 New Zealand Trotting Cup, 2017 Inter Dominion Pacing Championship
Mark Hanover	1991 Inter Dominion Pacing Championship
Millwood Nike	2022 Avon City Ford Ace of Diamonds (2YO Fillies) Mobile Pace
No Matter Wat	2022 New Zealand Oaks
Oscar Bonavena	2023 Dominion Trot
Pride Of Petite (trotter)	1996 & 1997 Inter Dominion Trotting Championship
Self Assured	2019 Auckland Pacing Cup, 2020 New Zealand Trotting Cup, 2022 New Zealand Free For All
Smolda	2016 Inter Dominion Pacing Championship
Spankem	2020 New Zealand Free For All, Miracle Mile Pace, 2nd in 2019 & 2020 New Zealand Trotting Cup and 2020 Auckland Pacing Cup
Thefixer	2018 New Zealand Trotting Cup
Turn It Up	2018 Auckland Pacing Cup
Ultimate Sniper	2019 Inter Dominion Pacing Championship
Winterfell (trotter)	2019 Inter Dominion Trotting Championship
Young Rufus	2002 Auckland Pacing Cup

== See also ==
- Harness racing in New Zealand
