= Natalie Rasmussen =

Australian and New Zealand harness racer

Natalie Clair Rasmussen (born 1977) is a driver and trainer of Standardbred racehorses in Australia and New Zealand. She has been associated with many champions and is one of the leading trainers and drivers of harness horses in Australasia.

== Biography ==
Rasmussen was born in Townsville, Queensland, in 1977. Her father was a harness horse trainer and her sisters, Kylie and Vicki, have also been trainers and drivers.

Rasmussen initially drove and trained harness horses in her native Australia. She was the first woman in Australia to have trained and driven an Inter Dominion winner with Blacks A Fake who she went on to win the championship with a further three times. In 2009, Rasmussen was inducted into the Inter Dominion Hall of Fame.

In 2010–2011, Rasmussen briefly tried her hand at training Thoroughbreds and had a winner at the Gold Coast with Abu Dhabi Gold.

Rasmussen later moved to New Zealand and formally trained in partnership with Mark Purdon from 2014. During this period they dominated the major New Zealand races such as the New Zealand Trotting Cup, Auckland Pacing Cup and the Harness Jewels.

In mid-November 2020, Rasmussen and Purdon announced they would cease their training partnership as from 31 December 2020. They would lease their Rolleston stables to Hayden and Amanda Cullen and, although staying involved when required, they would not be managing the day-to-day training operation. Rasmussen and Purdon said they intended to take a break after working with horses for a combined 70 years. Their last night as a partnership was the December 2020 Auckland Pacing Cup meeting at Alexandra Park in which they managed to quinella the Auckland Cup with Amazing Dream and Spankem.

From 1 October 2021, Purdon officially returned to the formal training ranks again and joined Hayden Cullen in partnership. It was also announced that Rasmussen would then re-join him in fulltime training from 1 January 2022, replacing Cullen, who would revert to being stable foreman again.

== Notable horses ==
Top horses that Rasmussen has been associated with include:

- Adore Me, co-trained to win the 2014 New Zealand Trotting Cup.
- Amazing Dream, co-trained to win the 2020 Auckland Pacing Cup.
- Blacks A Fake, trained and driven to win the 2006 Victoria Cup (harness race), 2008 A G Hunter Cup and the Inter Dominion Pacing Championship a record four times (2006, 2007, 2008 & 2010).
- Dream About Me, co-trained to win the 2016 Auckland Pacing Cup.
- Have Faith In Me, co-trained to win the 2015 New Zealand Trotting Derby & Auckland Pacing Cup.
- Lazarus, co-trained to win the 2016 New Zealand Trotting Derby, 2016 & 2017 New Zealand Trotting Cup and 2017 Inter Dominion Pacing Championship.
- Self Assured, co-trained to win the 2019 and 2022 Auckland Pacing Cup & 2020 New Zealand Trotting Cup., driven to win the 2022 Auckland Cup.
- Smolda, co-trained to win the 2016 Inter Dominion Pacing Championship.
- Son Of Pearl
- Spankem, co-trained and driven to win the 2020 New Zealand Free For All, co-trained to win the 2019 Miracle Mile Pace.
- Thefixer, co-trained and driven to win the 2018 New Zealand Trotting Cup.
- Turn It Up, co-trained to win the 2018 Auckland Pacing Cup.
- Ultimate Sniper, co-trained and driven to win the 2019 New Zealand Trotting Derby & 2019 Inter Dominion Pacing Championship.
- Vincent, co-trained to win the 2017 New Zealand Trotting Derby; co-trained and driven to win the 2017 Auckland Pacing Cup.

== See also ==
- Harness racing in Australia
- Harness racing in New Zealand
