= Tony Herlihy =

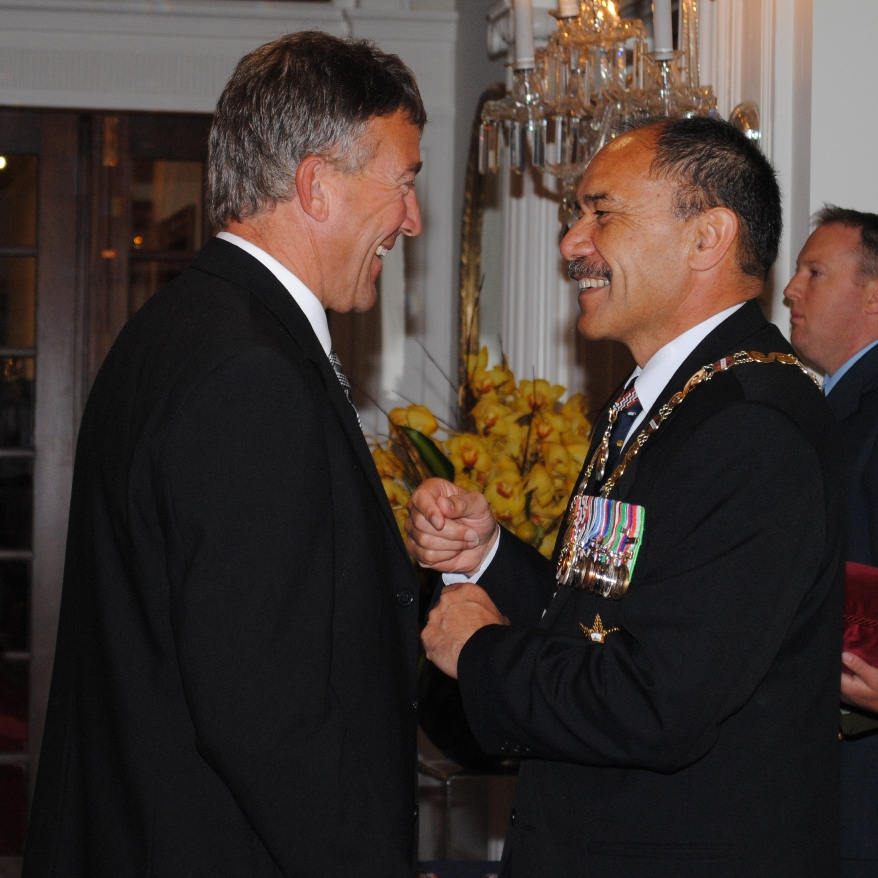
Herlihy's investiture as a Member of the New Zealand Order of Merit by the governor-general, Sir Jerry Mateparae (right), in 2012

Anthony Grant Herlihy MNZM (born 4 October 1958) is a New Zealand driver and trainer of standardbred racehorses. He was associated with many champions and has been a leading driver of harness horses in New Zealand. In 2014, he was inducted into the New Zealand Trotting Hall of Fame, and he has also been inducted into the Inter Dominion Hall of Fame.

Herlihy was born in Te Puke on 4 October 1958, and was educated at Te Awamutu College. In the 2012 New Year Honours, he was appointed a Member of the New Zealand Order of Merit, for services to harness racing.

== Notable race wins ==
The following are some notable wins during Herlihy's career:

- Badlands Bute - 2004 Great Northern Derby & 2005 New Zealand Trotting Derby
- Buster Hanover - 1998 Inter Dominion Trotting Championship
- Chokin - winner 1993 New Zealand Messenger Championship & New Zealand Trotting Cup, 1993 & 1994 Auckland Pacing Cup
- Christopher Vance - 1990 Great Northern Derby, 1991 New Zealand Messenger Championship, New Zealand Trotting Cup & Auckland Pacing Cup
- Comedy Lad - 1986 Auckland Pacing Cup
- Delft - 2006 Inter Dominion Trotting Championship
- Diamond Field - 1994 Rowe Cup & Inter Dominion Trotting Championship
- Directorship - 1992 Dominion Handicap
- Fly Like An Eagle - 2012 New Zealand Trotting Derby
- Franco Hat Trick - 1998 Chariots of Fire
- Gee du Jour - 1991 Rowe Cup
- Ginger Man - 1995 Chariots of Fire
- Godfrey - 1988 Great Northern Derby
- Gotta Go Cullen - 2008 New Zealand Messenger Championship & Auckland Pacing Cup
- Krug - 2021 Great Northern Derby
- Luxury Liner - 1988 New Zealand Trotting Cup, 1987 & 1988 Auckland Pacing Cup
- Montana Vance - 1994 New Zealand Messenger Championship
- Ohoka Punter - 2013 Great Northern Derby
- One Over Kenny - 2007 & 2009 Rowe Cup
- Pic Me Pockets - 2000 New Zealand Messenger Championship
- Pride Of Petite - 1997 Inter Dominion Trotting Championship
- Sharp And Telford - 1996 Auckland Pacing Cup
- Temporale - 2017 Rowe Cup

== See also ==
- Harness racing in New Zealand
