= Adios Butler =

Standardbred racehorse

- Breed: Standardbred
- Sire: Adios
- Dam: Debby Hanover
- Sex: Stallion
- Foaled: 1956
- Trainer: Clint Hodgins

Record
- 1:54.3 mile

Honors
- 1960-61 USTA Horse of the Year

The horse Adios Butler, also known as "The Butler" (1956–1983), was a North American harness racing champion.

== Background ==
Sired by the Standardbred Adios and out of a broodmare named Debby Hanover, Adios Butler was trained by Paige West and driven by Clint Hodgins in 1959.

== Racing career ==
In 1959, Adios Butler won the Cane Pace, then the Little Brown Jug, where he was the first horse to win with a sub-two-minute mile, and finally, the Messenger Stakes, doing it in track and stake record time to become the first pacer to capture the Triple Crown of Harness Racing for Pacers. In 1960, Adios Butler was sold in part to Ohio interests and while he remained in the care of Paige West, he was driven throughout the rest of his career by Eddie Cobb.

The following year, he lost only one race on a muddy track and later recorded a 1:54.3 mile, the then-fastest time in harness racing history. Adios Butler was named "United States Harness Horse of the Year" in 1960 and 1961 by the United States Trotting Association and the United States Harness Writers Association.

== Stud record ==
After his racing career, Adios Butler was retired to stud at Fair Chance Farms in Washington Court House, Ohio. Despite facing fertility problems throughout his career as a stallion he sired such notable pacers as Honest Story, Pantry Man, El Patron, Escondido, Van Kirk, Uncle Frank, Ocean Mouth, Dean Butler, Lord Butler, Trial Lawyer, Starboard Butler and many others.

== See also ==
- List of racehorses
