= Flashing Red =

Australian Standardbred racehorse

- Breed: Standardbred
- Discipline: Pacing
- Sire: Echelon
- Grandsire: Troublemaker
- Dam: Courvy Kazi
- Maternal grandsire: Courvoisier
- Sex: Stallion
- Foaled: 1997
- Country: Australia
- Color: Brown
- Breeder: John Campbell
- Owner: 1. Eric Blomquist; 2. Barrie Rattray; 3. Stuart Hunter & Norm Jenkins
- Trainer: 1. Eric Blomquist; 2. Stuart Hunter; 3. Tim Butt & Phil Anderson

Record
- 171: 38-31-26

Earnings
- $2,000,502

Major wins
- 2005 Ballarat Cup; 2006, 2007 New Zealand Trotting Cup; 2007 Auckland Pacing Cup

Awards
- Queensland Horse of the Year; 2006/07 New Zealand Horse of the Year; 2007 NZ Aged Pacer of the Year

Honors
- Queensland Harness Racing Hall of Fame
- Last updated on: 11 August 2011.

Flashing Red is a brown Australia bred Standardbred racehorse that was foaled in 1997. He is notable in that he won both the Auckland Pacing Cup and two New Zealand Trotting Cups. These races are the richest harness races in New Zealand. He was victorious in every harness racing state of Australia and New Zealand and earned over $2,000,000 during his racing career.

He was inducted into the Queensland Harness Racing Hall of Fame in 2008 and the Tasmanian Harness Racing Hall of Fame in 2014.

== Breeding ==
John Campbell bred Flashing Red who was by his stallion Echelon (US1.50.6, 32 wins, $558,568) and he was the last foal of his dam the unraced Courvy Kazi by Courvoisier. Echelon sired 107 winners during six seasons at stud. Flashing Red was inbred to Meadow Skipper in the third and fourth generations (3f x 4f). Eric Blomquist, a Tasmanian owner-trainer purchased Flashing Red privately as a yearling.

== Racing career ==
Flashing Red was a winner as a two-year-old for Blomquist and was second in the Tasmanian Metro Stakes and third in the Tasmanian Golden Slipper. He won 16 races from 60 starts for Blomquist including the Danbury Park Cup, the 2002 and 2003 Hobart Free For All, plus the $25,000 Devonport Cup by the end of his five-year-old campaign.

Barrie Rattray then purchased Flashing Red for $20,000 and sold him afterwards to Stuart Hunter and Norm Jenkins for $40,000. His new owners were hoping that he would be successful in Queensland racing. Flashing Red confirmed their hopes in 2004 by winning the $50,000 Cordina Sprint at Harold Park, Group 2 (G2) Queensland Winter Cup at Albion Park, pacing the 2,680 metres in 1.57.4 mile rate, and the (G2) Albion Park Winter Cup.

In 2005 Flashing Red won the $105,000 Ballarat Pacing Cup when he defeated Sokyola, and the listed South Australian Barastoc Cup (Clipsal Cup) and also finished second in the South Australia Cup to Young Rufus.

In 2006 he won the New Zealand Cup, Victorian Popular Alm Free for All (FFA), Ashburton Flying Stakes, Methven Cup (both in New Zealand) and two heats of the Inter Dominion Pacing Championship in Tasmania.

In 2007 he won the New Zealand Cup (for the second time) running a NZ record time over the 3,200 metres and Auckland Cup and was second in the Tooheys Mile to Hexus.

Despite being trained in Australia for most of his career, his greatest achievements came in staying races on the larger tracks in New Zealand, where he won the New Zealand Trotting Cup as a nine-year-old and 10-year-old, in 2006 and 2007. He also won the 2007 Auckland Cup and the 2006/07 New Zealand Horse of the Year and Australasian Pacers Grand Circuit titles.

== Stud record ==
Flashing Red was retired to stand at Roydon Lodge Stud, Wellington, N.Z. at a service fee of $1,500 plus GST.

== See also ==
- Harness racing in Australia
- Harness racing in New Zealand
