= New Zealand Trotting Derby =

New Zealand Derby
- Class: Group I
- Location: Addington Raceway; Christchurch, New Zealand
- Inaugurated: 1914
- Race type: Standardbred - Flat racing
- Website: www.addington.co.nz

Race information
- Distance: 2600m
- Surface: Dirt
- Track: Left-handed oval
- Qualification: Three-year-old horses
- Purse: NZ $300,000

The New Zealand Derby is a classic event in New Zealand for 3 year old harness horses, run at Addington Raceway.

== History ==
Formerly called the New Brighton Derby Stakes from 1914 to 1925, the race was conducted by the New Brighton Trotting Cub and decided in the Autumn. In 1925, it was taken over by the Metropolitan Trotting Club and decided in the Spring. In 1982 it was switched to the Summer.

In 1968–1969, the race was 1 1/2 miles and in 1970–1972, 1m 5f. In 1973-83 it was a standing start race over 2600 metres.

From 1984, it became a 2600 Metres Mobile race.

== Records ==
Most wins by a driver:

- 12 - Maurice Holmes (1928, 1930, 1931, 1938, 1939, 1942, 1946, 1947, 1954, 1957, 1960, 1972)
- 12 - Mark Purdon (1993, 1995, 1996, 1997, 2001, 2002, 2004, 2008, 2013, 2016, 2017, 2022)
- 4 - Jack Litten (1951, 1953, 1955, 1964)

Most wins by an owner:

- 4 - H F Nicoll (1921, 1928, 1930, 1931)

== Race results ==
The past winners of the race are as follows:

Year	Horse	Owner(s)	Driver	Time
2025	Marketplace	Mrs G J Kennard, P I Kennard, P I Baken, Small Car World Ltd, R J Magness, R W Todd	Craig Ferguson	3:08.9
2024	We Walk By Faith	Dennis & Mark Dunford	Craig Ferguson	3:10.9
2023	Merlin	Montana Park Pty Ltd	Zac Butcher	3:08.5
2022	Akuta	Cullen Breeding Limited, Mark Purdon	Mark Purdon	3:05.6
2021	Krug	Mrs C M Dalgety, M P Hanning, McKerrow Bloodstock Limited, G P Merlo, P J Creighton, Mrs M C Creighton, G E Dickey, K J Cummings	Blair Orange	3:10.9
2020	no race held			
2019	Ultimate Sniper	Mrs GJ Kennard, PI Kennard, GR Douglas, PJ Creighton, Mrs MC Creighton, KJ Riseley	Natalie Rasmussen	3:13.3
2018	Sheriff	GW Deakins, Mrs PP Gillan, RV Masefield, Small Car World Ltd	Blair Orange	3:05.4
2017	Vincent (Aust)	WR Feiss	Mark Purdon	3:06.0
2016	Lazarus	Mrs GJ Kennard, PI Kennard, TG Casey, KJ Riseley	Mark Purdon	3:08.5
2015	Have Faith In Me	Dennis & Mark Dunford	Tim Williams	3:09.2
2014	Locharburn	K K Chapman, Mrs B G Chapman	Dexter Dunn	3:11.0
2013	Border Control	P I & G J Kennard Bloodstock Limited, N Pilcher, G R Douglas	Mark Purdon	3:10.6
2012	Fly Like An Eagle	Mrs G J Kennard, P I Kennard, N Pilcher, G R Douglas, P J Cr	Tony Herlihy	3:12.3
2011	Gold Ace	Mrs W A Reid, D G Moore, M Ng, D D Syndicate	Peter Ferguson	3:12.3
2010	Captain Peacock	GAPMAD Syndicate, G L Ball, W J Wyllie, R Boon, D Ball	Mark Jones	3:14.1
2009	Sleepy Tripp	T D Taylor, Mrs A V Taylor	David Butcher	3:11.5
2008	Auckland Reactor	A J Parker, Mrs P R A Parker	Mark Purdon	3:09.4
2007	Changeover	A.T.C. Trot 2006 Syndicate	Jim Curtin	3:11.8
2006	Pay Me Christian	Pay Me Christian Syndicate	David Butt	3:18.3
2005	Badlands Bute	Lincoln Farms Ltd	Tony Herlihy	3:13.0
2004	Likmesiah	Met Two Syndicate	Mark Purdon	3:13.3
2003	Elsu	Mrs J Walters/Double Up Synd/Est D Hudson/Mrs P Small	David Butcher	3:16.5
2002	Jack Cade	J H Seaton, M Purdon	Mark Purdon	3:14.3
2001	Young Rufus	Lets Party Syndicate	Mark Purdon	3:18.0
2000	Stars And Stripes	C N Radford, Mrs J Z Radford	Ken Barron	3:14.5
1999	Courage Under Fire	G W Brodie	Colin De Filippi	3:15.9
1998	Holmes D G	Second Five Syndicate	Barry Purdon	3:11.1
1997	Bogan Fella	P J Cates, Mrs J Cates	Mark Purdon	3:11.6
1996	The Court Owl	W G Kitcher, G W Hutchison	Mark Purdon	3:13.1
1995	Il Vicolo	J H Seaton, M Purdon	Mark Purdon	3:17.4
1994	Ginger Man	G W Brodie	Barry Purdon	3:15.7
1993	Mark Roy	R R Reid/R C Purdon/Mrs J C Reid/Lorna Reid Synd	Mark Purdon	3:16.2
1992	Kiwi Scooter	B Purdon, C C Johnson	Barry Purdon	3:13.6
1991	Master Musician	R J Dunn, K L McDonald, E C Storck	Robert Dunn	3:13.5
1990	Winning Blue Chip	K G Chandler, W K Parlane, R G Chandler	Anthony Butt	3:12.2
1989	Westburn Grant	B J Breen, Mrs C M Breen, V W Frost, Mrs M Frost	Vic Frost	3:16.5
1988	Dillon Dean	K C Burley, D P Dwyer	Maurice McKendry	3:16.0
1987	Race Ruler	A E Wallis, L W Giraud	Maurice McKendry	3:16.4
1986	Alba's Reign	G Harris, C R Elliott, Mrs T D Elliott	Graeme Harris	3:17.8
1985	Placid Victor	Mrs L G Wilson	Maurice McKendry	3:16.4
1984	Naval Officer	B A O'Meara, R Taiaroa & D W Edwards	Michael R De Filippi	3:22.5
1983	Mighty Me	C W & Mrs S M McLachlan	Robert M Cameron	3:25.6
1982	Hilarious Guest	M G Vermeulen	Peter N Jones	3:20.9
1980	Amaze	J M & Mrs E C Connelly & S E Harley	Jack W Smolenski	3:21.7
1979	Game Adios	A L & Mrs B Kerslake & F Woolley	Robert M Cameron	3:24.8
1978	Sovereign	J M G & M Osborne & J W Smolenski	Jack W Smolenski	3:29.6
1977	Motu Prince	G F Timperley	Peter Wolfenden	3:21.1
1976	Rustic Zephyr	Mr & Mrs A K Greenslade & Mr & Mrs R L Sanders	J B Noble	3:24.6
1975	Main Adios	Mrs B & A L Kerslake & F Woolley	Derek G Jones	3:23.3
1974	Noodlum	Mrs A A Wilson & F L Holmes	F L Holmes	3:27
1973	Koarakau	C Wood	G Nyhan	3:23
1972	Willie Win	R H Negus	M F Holmes	3:25
1971	Bachelor Star	W F Woolley	Robert M Cameron	3:29.6
1970	New Law	L Law & F E Newfield	Felix E Newfield	3:28.8
1969	Berkleigh	Mrs & C A Winter	J A Carmichael	3:18.6
1968	Leroy	Mrs H & E J Goodyer	A K Holmes	3:13.2
1967	Good Chase	O J Watson	D G Watson	3:12.6
1966	Holy Hal	J R Rodgers & D Keenan	K Balloch	3:10.6
1965	Bass Strait	A L Bell & Cecil Devine	Cecil Devine	3:14.8
1964	Doctor Barry	Dr B W Nixon & B Steel	J D Litten	3:13.4
1963	Bellajily	D Matyasevic	Doody Townley	3:12.6
1962	Tactile	A J & D P Dynes	K Balloch	3:10.4
1961	Lordship	Mrs D G Nyhan	Denis Nyhan	3:12
1960	Student Prince	H S Barry	M F Holmes	3:12.8
1959	Stormont	J E V & K A Chapman	K A Chapman	3:11.8
1958	Blue	A Holmes & J Shelly	F G Holmes	3:12.4
1957	Tobacco Road	N Simpson	M F Holmes	3:17.8
1956	Bon Ton	D A Morland	D A Morland	3:15.2
1955	False Step	J Smyth	J D Litten	3:12.6
1954	Royal Minstrel	Sir John McKenzie	M F Holmes	3:15
1954	Single Medoro	Mrs M R Elliott & E J Kennerley	R D Kennerley	3:15
1953	Caduceus	D D & D R Moore	J D Litten	3:13.4
1952	Rupee	J Grice	Doody Townley	3:15
1951	Fallacy	J D Litten	J D Litten	3:12.2
1950	Johnny Globe	D G Nyhan	D G Nyhan	3:15
1949	Burns Night	G McKendry	G McKendry	3:16.2
1948	Croughton	J S South	R Young	3:15.8
1947	Congo Song	A Holmes & P Symes	M F Holmes	3:17.6
1946	Free Fight	D McFarlane	M F Holmes	3:17.8
1945	Sir Michael	C Tasker	R Young	3:23
1944	Air Marshall	A W Moore	R Donald	3:21.8
1943	Bonny Bridge	G Aitcheson	F Holmes	3:20.2
1942	Scottish Lady	D McFarlane	M F Holmes	3:25
1941	Pacing Power	G Lancaster	R B Berry	3:19.8
1940	Gold Chief	J B Westerman	R Messervey	3:22.6
1939	Imperial Jade	McFarlane & Scott	M F Holmes	3:22.2
1938	Aldershot	A J Nicoll	M F Holmes	3:19.6
1937	Two's Loose	G R Hudson	J Bryce jnr	3:20
1936	Parisienne	Mrs D R Revell	R B Berry	3:19.6
1935	Double Great	J R McKenzie	J Bryce jnr	3:44
1934	Gamble	T C Butcher	M B Edwards	3:19.8
1933	War Buoy	Mrs E K Mauger	M B Edwards	3:16.2
1932	Taxpayer	J R McKenzie	G Mouritz	3:20.2
1931	Ciro	H F Nicoll	M F Holmes	3:23.6
1930	Arethusa	H F Nicoll	M F Holmes	3:25.2
1929	Purser	S Chambers	L O Thomas	3:22.2
1928	Wrackler	H F Nicoll	M F Holmes	3:25
1927	Daphne De Oro	J Washington	F Holmes	3:25.8
1926	Shadowland	J F Poff	W J Tomkinson	3:27.4
1925	Kohara	R M Morten	J Bryce	3:24.8
1925	Native Chief	J Duffy	J J Kennerley	3:23.8
1924	Taurekareka	R M Morten	J Bryce	3:22.2
1923	Acron	J R McKenzie	J J Kennerley	3:29.4
1922	Great Hope	J R Corrigan	J Bryce	3:31
1921	Childe Pointer	H F Nicoll	D Warren	3:26
1920	Doraldina	F E Jones	F E Jones	3:31
1919	Locanda Dillon	W H Robbins	A Pringle	3:33.8
1918	Albert Cling	H Green	J Henderson	3:26.8
1917	Peter Mac	A E Ives	A Hendricksen	3:35.8
1916	Author Dillon	J Knight	B Jarden	3:29
1915	Prince Akwood	Mr Clifton	A Hendricksen	3:34.6
1914	Admiral Wood	W Kerr	C Kerr	3:37.4

== Other major races ==
- Auckland Trotting Cup
- Dominion Handicap
- Great Northern Derby
- Inter Dominion Pacing Championship
- Inter Dominion Trotting Championship
- New Zealand Free For All
- New Zealand Messenger
- New Zealand Sires Stakes 3yo Final
- New Zealand Trotting Cup
- Noel J Taylor Mile
- Rowe Cup
- TAB Eureka
- The Race by betcha

== See also ==
- Harness racing
- Harness racing in New Zealand
