= Northern Derby =

- Class: Group I
- Location: Alexandra Park; Auckland, New Zealand
- Inaugurated: 1916
- Race type: Standardbred - Flat racing
- Website: www.alexandrapark.co.nz

Race information
- Distance: 2700m
- Surface: dirt
- Track: Right-handed oval, Mobile Barrier
- Qualification: Three-year-old horses

The Northern Derby, which was formerly known as the Great Northern Derby, is a Group 1 harness racing event for 3 year old standardbreds. It is a major event for 3 year old colts and geldings in New Zealand and currently run at Alexandra Park in Auckland, in March.

== Records ==
Most wins by a driver:

- 6 - Mark Purdon (1995, 1996, 2008, 2016, 2020, 2022|
- 5 - Barry Purdon (1981, 1991, 1993, 1994, 1997)
- 6 - Tony Herlihy (1988, 1990, 2004, 2013, 2021)

== Winners list ==
Winners of the Northern Derby include some of the best horses produced in New Zealand.

| Year | Horse | Owner | Driver | Time |
|---|---|---|---|---|
| 2025 | Marketplace | Mrs G J Kennard, P I Kennard, P I Baken, Small Car World Ltd, R J Magness, R W Todd | Craig Ferguson | 3:14.9 |
| 2024 | Cold Chisel | Montana Park Pty Ltd | Zachary Butcher | 3:20.82 |
| 2023 | Merlin | Montana Park Pty Ltd | Zachary Butcher | 3:18.2 |
| 2022 | Akuta | Cullen Breeding Limited, Mark Purdon | Mark Purdon | 3:19.9 |
| 2021 | Krug | Mrs C M Dalgety, M P Hanning, McKerrow Bloodstock Limited, G P Merlo, P J Creighton, Mrs M C Creighton, G E Dickey, K J Cummings | Tony Herlihy | 3:18.0 |
| 2020 | Amazing Dream | Mrs J L Feiss | Mark Purdon | 3:16.2 |
| 2019 | Ultimate Sniper | Mrs G J Kennard, P I Kennard, G R Douglas, P J Creighton, Mrs M C Creighton, K J Riseley | Natalie Rasmussen | 3:22.6 |
| 2018 | Chase Auckland | Alabar Racing Syndicate | Natalie Rasmussen | 3:16.8 |
| 2017 | Raukapuka Ruler | Colt 45 Syndicate | Dexter Dunn | 3:17.4 |
| 2016 | Lazarus | Mrs G J Kennard, P I Kennard, T G Casey, K J Riseley | Mark Purdon | 3:17.1 |
| 2015 | Have Faith In Me | D M Dunford, M D Dunford | Tim Williams | 3:18.7 |
| 2014 | Tiger Tara | R L Sandford, Mrs J A Sandford, J S Gould, G R Dunn | Gerard O'Reilly | 3:21.1 |
| 2013 | Ohoka Punter | K Carville | Tony Herlihy | 3:19.2 |
| 2012 | Ideal Scott | Est J F Twomey, J W Devlin, Mrs P G Hughes, Mrs M E Green | Todd Macfarlane | 3:19.1 |
| 2011 | Sushi Sushi | P Sequenzia, A Cendron, P D'Alessi, P Sergi | Greg Sugars | 3:17.0 |
| 2010 | Russley Rascal | N Pilcher, R W Grice | Blair Orange | 3:20.5 |
| 2009 | Stunin Cullen | T McDonald, E C Griffin | Anthony Butt | 3:23.2 |
| 2008 | Fiery Falcon | Ms M M Wilson, Est Sir Roy McKenzie, Rona McKay, P I Kennard, Mrs G J Kennard, Clive McKay | Mark Purdon | 3:20.8 |
| 2007 | Changeover | A.T.C. Trot 2006 Syndicate | David Butcher | 3:21.8 |
| 2005 | Monkey King | Cavalla Bloodstock Limited | Todd Mitchell | 3:24.8 |
| 2004 | Badlands Bute | Lincoln Farms Ltd | Tony Herlihy | 3:23.8 |
| 2003 | Winforu | Mrs M E Wych, J C McJorrow | Maurice McKendry | 3:01.6 |
| 2002 | Elsu | Mrs J Walters, Double Up Syndicate, Est D Hudson, Mrs P Small | David Butcher | 3:20.7 |
| 2001 | All Hart | J R Duncalf, W Harvey, R C Mills, L C O'Connor | David Butcher | 3:20.5 |
| 2000 | Matai | Mackenzie A.T.C. Trot 2000 Syndicate | Brent Mangos | 3:25.2 |
| 1999 | Stars And Stripes | C N Radford, Mrs J Z Radford | Ken Barron | 3:20.4 |
| 1998 | Courage Under Fire | G W Brodie | Colin De Filippi | 3:20.9 |
| 1997 | Holmes D G | Second Five Syndicate | Barry Purdon | 3:20.1 |
| 1996 | The Court Owl | W G Kitcher, G W Hutchison | Mark Purdon | 3:25.7 |
| 1996 | Lavros Star | R M Cameron, Kypros Kotzikas | Anthony Butt | 3:23.4 |
| 1995 | Il Vicolo | J H Seaton, Mark Purdon | Mark Purdon | 3:28.1 |
| 1994 | Ginger Man | G W Brodie | Barry Purdon | 3:23.3 |
| 1993 | Hitchcock | L G Christensen, W R Pengelly, J S S Richardson, N J Taylor | Barry Purdon | 3:23.0 |
| 1992 | Rainbow Fella | T J Hackett, R J Hall | Richard Brosnan | 3:28.2 |
| 1991 | Sogo | Parnell Syndicate | Barry Purdon | 3:23.5 |
| 1990 | Christopher Vance | R R Reid, Lorna Reid Syndicate, Mrs J C Reid | Tony Herlihy | 3:23.3 |
| 1989 | Inky Lord | G M Saunders | Ricky May | 3:29.9 |
| 1988 | Godfrey | R O Baynes, Mrs B M Ludke | Tony Herlihy | 3:22.5 |
| 1987 | Race Ruler | A E Wallis, L W Giraud | Maurice McKendry | 3:25.2 |
| 1986 | Laser Lad | G Calderwood, B Vickery, W L Crawford, K J English | Peter Jones | 3:25.6 |
| 1985 | Nardinski | B J, B R, D J & Mrs Smolenski | Jack Smolenski | 3:28.9 |
| 1984 | Roydon Glen | Roy McKenzie | W F (Fred) Fletcher | 3:29.6 |
| 1983 | Mighty Me | C W & Mrs S M McLachlan | Robert M Cameron | 3:31.2 |
| 1982 | Mel's Boy | P J & Est B L Robertson | Jack Smolenski | 3:26 |
| 1981 | Melton Monarch | Jim Dalgety | Barry Purdon | 3:30.9 |
| 1980 | Armbro Wings | S K & J A Somerville & A L Milne | Colin De Filippi | 3:36.3 |
| 1979 | Matai Dreamer | A L & Mrs N Milne | Robert M Cameron | 3:29.8 |
| 1978 | Main Star | A L & Mrs B Kerslake & F Woolley | Robert M Cameron | 3:26.8 |
| 1977 | Sapling | R Given & G C Cruickshank | D J McNaught | 3:28.7 |
| 1976 | Ripper's Delight | Ripper Syndicate | A K Holmes | 3:32.6 |
| 1974 | Captain Harcourt | E J Bennett | Peter Wolfenden | 3:27.6 |
| 1973 | Speedy Guest | W F Woolley | Jack W Smolenski | 3:13.4 |
| 1971 | Roydon Roux | Roy McKenzie | Doug R Mangos | 3:12.8 |
| 1970 | Caledonian Garrison | H C & J S JStormont | J Butcher | 3:16.6 |
| 1969 | First Batch | D Mace | R J Weatherley | 3:14.2 |
| 1968 | Garcon Roux | Roy McKenzie | J B Noble | 3:21.8 |
| 1967 | Cardinal Garrison | Mrs R C Nelmes & P G Trigg | R Young | 3:10.4 |
| 1966 | Governor Frost | C Hadley | Peter Wolfenden | 2:56.2 |
| 1965 | Tutta Tryax | H S Barry | M F Holmes | 2:58.2 |
| 1964 | Golden Oriole | M A Butt | W R Butt | 2:55.2 |
| 1963 | Scottish Laddie | Roy McKenzie | Doug Mangos | 2:57.8 |
| 1962 | Tactile | A J & D P Dynes | D J Townley | 3:11.2 |
| 1961 | Waitaki Hanover | F Smith | Peter Wolfenden | 3:15.6 |
| 1960 | King Hal | C E Dillon | D G Jones | 3:23.6 |
| 1959 | Sun Chief | S Easton | Doody Townley | 3:14.2 |
| 1958 | Call Boy | C E Blackwell | R C Purdon | 3:17.2 |
| 1957 | Firmament | W Hosking | F Smith jnr | 3:22-3 |
| 1956 | Giuseppe | H M Allen & L J R Barrett | H M Allen | 3:25.4 |
| 1955 | Canyon | R B Levy | A B Levy | 3:20.2 |
| 1954 | Celestial | W Hosking | J K Hughes | 3:18 |
| 1953 | Scottish Brigade | C C Scott | J B Scott | 3:16 |
| 1952 | Macall | K D Fraser | D G Jones | 3:21.4 |
| 1951 | Fabius | J S Shaw | J S Shaw | 3:19.2 |
| 1950 | Johnny Globe | D G Nyhan | D G Nyhan | 3:17.2 |
| 1949 | Soangetaha | Mrs M A Ryland | D G Jones | 3:20.4 |
| 1948 | Chamfer | D McFarlane | M F Holmes | 3:19 |
| 1947 | Sir Vivian | P V Flexman | R Young | 3:18.4 |
| 1946 | Snowflake | L F Berkett | L F Berkett | 3:19 |
| 1945 | Local Gold | J H Parsons | A B Holmes | 3:21.4 |
| 1944 | Acropolis | T J Atkinson | R B Berry | 3:29.6 |
| 1944 | Josie Dell | F A Bridgens | G Gray | 3:25.2 |
| 1943 | Golden Shadow | T Rothwell | J Bryce jnr | 3:23 |
| 1942 | Symphony | E G Bridgens | F J Smith | 3:24 |
| 1941 | Peter'S Find | A W Bailey | G T Mitchell | 3:24 |
| 1940 | Bonniedene | Mesdames G Young & G Downes | F J Smith | 3:32.4 |
| 1939 | Contender | J T Paul | J T Paul | 3:28 |
| 1938 | Horsepower | G Rosenbaum | R B Berry | 3:38 |
| 1936 | Parisienne | R Revell | R B Berry | 3:30.6 |
| 1935 | Valdor | S W Kelly | R B Berry | 3:22.6 |
| 1934 | Subsidy | W J Doyle | W J Doyle | 3:23.2 |
| 1933 | Chancellor | E G & F A Bridgens | F J Smith | 3:27.4 |
| 1932 | Indianapolis | G J Barton | E C McDermott | 3:26 |
| 1931 | Tempest | G J Barton | W J Tomkinson | 3:30 |
| 1930 | Red Shadow | Deyell & Neale | J Bryce | 3:20.4 |
| 1929 | Great Parrish | J T Paul | J T Paul | 3:30.6 |
| 1928 | Wrackler | H F Nicoll | M F Holmes | 3:35.4 |
| 1927 | Daphne de Oro | J Washington | F Holmes | 3:34.6 |
| 1926 | Great Peter | J W Tims | J T Paul | 3:30 |
| 1925 | Nantwich | H F Nicoll | A Hendricksen | 3:29.6 |
| 1924 | Glenelg | C M Ollivier | A Butterfield | 3:33.4 |
| 1923 | Taurekareka | R M Morten | J Bryce | 3:29 |
| 1922 | Acron | J R McKenzie | J J Kennerley | 3:29.2 |
| 1921 | Great Hope | R McMillan | R A McMillan | 3:31 |
| 1920 | Nelson Derby | G Craw | J G Robertson | 3:32.2 |
| 1919 | Lady Switin | H F Nicoll | F Holmes | 3:35.6 |
| 1918 | Locanda Dillon | W H Robbins | A Pringle | 3:31.4 |
| 1917 | President Wilson | F J Remington | A Hendricksen | 3:34.6 |
| 1916 | Chid | W B Masham | J Bryce | 3:36.6 |

== Other major races ==
- Auckland Trotting Cup
- New Zealand Sires Stakes 3yo Final
- New Zealand Trotting Cup
- New Zealand Free For All
- New Zealand Trotting Derby
- Noel J Taylor Mile
- New Zealand Messenger
- Rowe Cup
- Dominion Handicap
- Inter Dominion Pacing Championship
- Inter Dominion Trotting Championship

== See also ==
- Harness racing
- Harness racing in New Zealand
