= Dominion (harness race) =

Annual race at the Addington Raceway in New Zealand

- Class: Group I
- Location: Addington Raceway; Christchurch, New Zealand
- Inaugurated: 1911
- Race type: Standardbred - Flat racing
- Website: www.addington.co.nz

Race information
- Distance: 3200m (2 miles)
- Surface: All weather
- Track: left-handed oval
- Qualification: Three-year-olds and up
- Purse: NZ $400,000 (2026)

The Dominion is a horse race held at the Addington Raceway each year in Christchurch, New Zealand for standardbred trotters.

The race is run in November over a distance of 3200m on the Friday of New Zealand Cup week. It is on the same day as the New Zealand Free For All.

It is one of the major harness races for trotters rather than pacers, and is considered to be the trotter's equivalent of the New Zealand Trotting Cup. Another similar race is the Rowe Cup races at Alexandra Park, Auckland.

== Records ==
Most wins:

- 3 - Lyell Creek (1999, 2000, 2004)
- 3 - Sundees Son (2020-22)
- 3 - Take A Moment (2001, 2002: dead heat with Martina H, 2003)

Most wins by a driver:

- 8 - Anthony Butt (1987, 1999, 2000, 2001, 2003, 2004, 2007, 2011)
- 4 - J Bryce (1916, 1919, 1928, 1929)
- 3 - Maurice Holmes (1932, 1954, 1955)
- 3 - Ricky May (1998, 2010, 2016)
- 3 - John Dunn (2020, 2021, 2022)

== Race results ==
The following are results of the Dominion Handicap:

Year	Horse	Hcp	Owner(s)	Driver	Time	Second	Third
2026	Gus	fr	R A Patrick	Pete McMullen	4:05.6	Higher Power	Habibti Pat
2025	Gus	fr	R A Patrick	Pete McMullen	4:04.1	Mr Love	Oscar Bonavena
2024	Just Believe	fr	Iona Trotter Syndicate	Greg Sugars	4:04.30	Mighty Logan	Oscar Bonavena
2023	Oscar Bonaveno	fr	Mark Purdon, C J Ryder	Mark Purdon	4:09.50	Smokin Bandar	Resolve
2022	Sundees Son	fr	Colin & Nancy Hair	John Dunn	3:58.40	Muscle Mountain	Five Wise Men
2021	Sundees Son	fr	Colin & Nancy Hair	John Dunn	3:56.6	Mataderos	Bolt For Brilliance
2020	Sundees Son	fr	Colin & Nancy Hair	John Dunn	4:00.5	Majestic Man	Tough Monarch
2019	Habibi Inta	fr	Julie Maghzal	Blair Orange	4:02.1	Tough Monarch	Monty Python
2018	Marcoola	fr	K B Ford, C B Ford	Clint Ford	4:08:0	Kyvalley Blur	Lemond
2017	Armaretto Sun	fr	K B Ford, Mrs D H Ford	Sheree Tomlinson	4:04.7	The Foot Tapper	Monty Python
2016	Monbet	fr	Greg Hope, Nina Hope, M J Molloy	Ricky May	4:00.7	Quite A Moment	Kyvalley Blur
2015	Master Lavros	fr	Kypros Kotzikas	Mark Jones	4:05.9	Alley Way	Sheemon
2014	Jaccka Justy	fr	CF Smaill, AG Smaill	Johnny Cox	4:05.2	Sheemon	Kincaslough
2013	Master Lavros	fr	Kypros Kotzikas	Mark Jones	4:05.1	Stig	Stent
2012	I Can Doosit	fr	Breckon Racing Syndicate	Mark Purdon	4:04.0	Stig	The Fiery Ginga
2011	Vulcan	fr	Mrs J A Butt, D J McKenzie	Anthony Butt	4:06.3	Dr Hook	Clover Don
2010	Stylish Monach	fr	Mrs A C Patterson	Ricky May	4:02.9	I Can Doosit	The Fat Controller
2009	Springbank Richard	fr	R A & Mrs D J Smith	N P Williamson	4:06.7	Sovereignty	Houdini Star
2008	Stig	fr	T G Butt, Mrs A Butt, J S Boyd, R G Thomas	David Butt	4:06.4	Roydon Flash	Idid It Myway
2007	Mountbatten	fr	Foxtrot Synd/P G Darby/K F Schmack/Mrs B M Hickman	Anthony Butt	4:07.6	Houdini Star	Braig
2006	Whatsundermykilt	fr	Mrs C L Smith/Mrs P A Fairbairn/G H Morris/T W Welham	Shane Walkinshaw	4:08.9	One Over Kenny	Jasmyn's Gift
2005	Pompallier	fr	Mrs J L Brosnan, Mrs M M Gibson	Colin De Filippi	4:10.5	Major Decision	Jasmyn's Gift
2004	Lyell Creek	10 m	Mrs K L Butt, G A V Bruton, The Creek Syndicate	Anthony Butt	4:08.9	Castleton's Mission	Play On
2003	Take A Moment	15 m	Long Drive Syndicate	Anthony Butt	4:05.5	Last Link	Allegro Agitato
2002	Martina H Take A Moment (dead heat)	fr	K D Marr, Mrs K Seu, S L Herewini, I D Malcolm (Martina H); Long Drive Syndicate (Take A Moment)	Derek Balle; Anthony Butt	4:08.5	-	Special Force
2001	Take A Moment	10 m	Long Drive Syndicate	Anthony Butt	4:09.6	Major Decision	Paramount Jack
2000	Lyell Creek	15 m	A M Butt, G A V Bruton	Anthony Butt	4:06.1	Frugal Echo	McGrady
1999	Lyell Creek	fr	G A V Bruton	Anthony Butt	4:14.4	Sundowner Bay	Andrew Eyre
1998	Cedar Fella	fr	Cherokee Syndicate	Ricky May	4:08.1	Sundon's Way	Africa
1997	Merinai	fr	N R Baker	James Stormont	4:11.1	Buster Hanover	Wagon Apollo
1996	Chiola Cola	fr	D N Hayes, H Horowitz, Mrs I T Horowitz	Shane Hayes	4:08.6	Pride Of Petite	Diedre's Pride
1995	Call Me Now	10 m	G J Nairn, P C Nairn, Mrs H H Pope, R G H Thomson	David Butt	4:05.7	Eastburn Grant	Chiola Cola
1994	David Moss	15 m	Est H W Cox, O Andersen	Maurice McKendry	4:06.6	Call Me Now	Breton Abbe
1993	David Moss	10 m	Est H W Cox, O Andersen	Robert Cameron	4:12.1	Diamond Field	Game Paul
1992	Directorship	10 m	Classic Nine Syndicate	Tony Herlihy	4:12.2	Rosie O'Grady	Staka Pride
1991	William Dee	fr	Glenn P Curach, Kevin J O'Gorman, Tony G Garelja, Eamon P Green	John Langdon	4:16.2	Gee du Jour	Directorship
1990	Sundon	fr	Sir Roy McKenzie	Peter Jones	4:12.8	Game Paul	William Dee
1989	Tobago	fr	R H Jenkins, Mrs D E Kean	Henry Skinner	4:08.4	Directorship	Troppo
1988	Landora's Pride	10 m	C T Allingham, Mrs V M Allingham	John Langdon	4:12.8	Tussle	Melvander
1987	Simon Katz	fr	R S Francis, P Rae	Anthony Butt	4:15.0	Tyron Scottie	Landora's Pride
1986	Tussle	10 m	Dr C H G Irvine	Peter Jones	4:13.8	Jenner	Melvander
1985	Admiral Soanai	fr	J McGill	Brian Gleeson	4:14.1	Jenner	Tussle
1984	Basil Dean	fr	R L Jamison & T P Newton	Kerry O'Reilly	4:12.9	Cal Brydon	Jenner
1983	Scotch Notch	10 m	J Wong	Graeme Lang	4:17.0	Sir Castleton	Basil Dean
1982	Cal Brydon	fr	Gordon R & B Newberry	Gordon R Newberry	4:14.6	Thriller Dee	Sir Castleton
1981	Stormy Morn	10 m	P G Moore	Tony Perucich	4:20.5	Game Way	About Now
1980	Scotch Tar	10 m	A W Dykman	Albert W (Slim) Dykman	4:16.6	Stormy Morn	Game Way; No Response (dead heat)
1979	Alias Armbro	fr	B W Crofts & G E Pilkington	M R De Filippi	4:12.3	Even Speed	About Now
1978	Scotch Tar	fr	A W Dykman	R M Cameron	4:11.6	Spartan Prince	Framalda
1977	Nigel Craig	fr	B L & W L Heron	B L Heron	4:15.6	Best Bet	Waipounamu
1976	Armbro Lady	fr	R E & S T Webster	K D Townley	4:17.3	Nigel Craig	Dupreez
1975	Hal Good	10m	A Chesmar	Denis Nyhan	4:20.5	Easton Light	Cee Ar
1974	Easton Light	30m	E R & Mrs T R Running	B M Running	4:13.1	Darky Forbes	Edis Nova
1973	Philemon	20m	W A Strachan & G R Taverner	Jack Smolenski	4:20.5	Batchelor Tom	Easton Light
1972	Easton Light	fr	E R & Mrs T R Running	B M Running	4:20.4	Precocious	Black Frost
1971	Precocious	fr	A H Carmichael	J A Carmichael	4:18.4	Merrin	Easton Light
1970	Johnny Gee	18 yds	Wes Butt	Wes Butt	4:08.2	Tony Bear	Precocious
1969	Tutira	12 yds	D H Butcher	J P Baker	4:21.0	Tony Bear	Briganelli
1968	Logan Count	12 yds	E A Clark	Leicester R Clark	4:18.2	Inferno	Markalan
1967	French Pass	fr	Roy McKenzie	Charlie Hunter	4:30.0		
1966	Tronso	fr	C R Berkett	Felix Newfield	4:20.6		
1965	Mighty Chief	fr	L R Clark	Doody Townley	4:25.0		
1964	Flaming Way	12 yds	J Wilson	A K Holmes	4:21.0		
1963	Min Scott	12 yds	Mrs G N Hunter	Charlie Hunter	4:18.8		
1962	Spinster Scott	fr	A A McCormick	R J Jones	4:19.8		
1961	Au Fait	36 yds	J McKay	R Young	4:15.8		
1960	Ordeal	12 yds	Mrs L M & W A Bradley	Free Holmes	4:17.4		
1959	Annual Report	12 yds	N Simpson	A M Purdon	4:19.2		
1958	Durbin Chief	36 yds	Mrs M F Collins, E Walsh & J R Woodcock	W P Walsh	4:17.6		
1957	Durbin Chief	fr	Mrs M F Collins, E Walsh & J R Woodcock	W P Walsh	4:24.0		
1956	Cabra	fr	P J Burke & A A Matheson	J Walsh	4:25.8		
1955	Recruit	36 yds	J J Rooney	Maurice Holmes	4.22:6		
1954	Fair Isle	24 yds	V Alborn & E J August	Maurice Holmes	4:18.6		
1953	Vodka	6 yds	J S Shaw	J S Shaw	4.:23.6		
1952	Precaution	fr	A Holmes & J Shelly	J McLennan jnr	4:21.0		
1951	Barrier Reef	36 yds	Mrs M Rice	D G Jones	4:18.4		
1950	Dictation	12 yds	J Wilson	J Wilson	4:16.4		
1949	Acclamation	12 yds	A M & R J Bruce	R Young	4:27.4		
1948	Great Venture	12 yds	J T Taylor	S A Edwards	4:27.6		
1947	Hidden Note	fr	D Stormont & M Stewart	D C Watts	4:30.4		
1946	Casablanca	fr	S T Webster	J B Pringle	4:31.4		
1945	Fantom	36 yds	J R McKenzie	G B Noble	4:28.4		
1944	Lady Scott	fr	Miss J & A F C Rushton	A Butterfield	4:36.8		
1944	Will Cary	fr	H M Allen	G McKendry	4:36.8		
1943	Bomber	fr	F E Graham	W J Doyle	4:30.8		
1942	Margin	72 yds	W Fairbairn	G Cameron	4:26.8		
1941	Peggoty	12 yds	R H Butterick	R H Butterick	4:30.6		
1940	Tan John	fr	W E Stickings	R Donald	4:31.2		
1939	Royal Romance	fr	V Alborn	V Alborn	4:27.0		
1938	Pilot Peter	fr	P J Andrews	R B Berry	4:27.0		
1937	Waikato Prince	36 yds	J Bryce	J Bryce jnr	4:31.0		
1936	Norma Bingen	24 yds	F Doherty	D C Watts	4:28.2		
1935	Sea Gift	36 yds	Archer & McFarlane	E J Smith	3:34.4		
1934	Trampfast	36 yds	W T Lowe	R B Berry	3:15.4		
1933	Huon Voyage	60 yds	F B Macfarlane	L O Thomas	4:32.6		
1932	Wrackler	60 yds	Durbar Lodge Ltd	Maurice Holmes	4:26.2		
1931	Olive Nelson	fr	J R Simpson	J R Simpson	4:33.0		
1930	Writer	fr	C P Cameron	R Donald	4:35.2		
1929	Western Voyage	fr	M O'Brien	J Bryce	4.35.8		
1928	Moneyspider	60 yds	J Bryce	J Bryce	4.30.8		
1927	Elzear	24 yds	G J Barton	J McLennan	4.41.4		
1926	Peterwah	72 yds	R C Fisken	R C Fisken	4.30.4		
1925	Napland	12 yds	G J Barton	W J Tomkinson	4.40.8		
1924	Nikora	48 yds	F Monk	F Monk	4.34.2		
1923	Native King	fr	Mrs G Watkins	R Pollock	4.37.2		
1922	Effie Bingen	fr	J Hardy	J McLennan	4.42.2		
1921	Wild Lad	12 secs	R C Fisken	R C Fisken	4.37.6		
1920	Gold Boy	7 secs	T Roe	T Roe	4.39.0		
1919	Whisht	5 secs	J R Corrigan	J Bryce	4.39.0		
1918	Whispering Willie	5 secs	C Allington	G B Murfitt	4.43.0		
1917	Olive L	10 secs	Mrs J Lawrence	E Berry	4.39.6		
1916	Whispering Willie	fr	C Allington	J Bryce	4.45.4		
1915	Michael Galindo	7 secs	C Tasker	C Tasker	4.42.2		
1914	Electrocute	7 secs	J Leslie	J Wright	4.44.0		
1913	Michael Galindo	12 secs	C Tasker	J Tasker	4.47.2		
1912	Master Raymond	10 secs	J Clarke	R Allen	4.52.2		
1911	Quincey	2 secs	S W Scott	S W Scott	4.37.4		

== See also ==
- Harness racing
- Harness racing in New Zealand

== Other major races ==
- Rowe Cup
- Auckland Trotting Cup
- New Zealand Trotting Cup
- Great Northern Derby
- Noel J Taylor Mile
- New Zealand Messenger
- Inter Dominion Pacing Championship
- Inter Dominion Trotting Championship
