= Noel J Taylor Memorial Mile =

- Class: Group I
- Location: Alexandra Park; Auckland, New Zealand
- Inaugurated: 1986
- Race type: Standardbred - Flat racing
- Website: www.alexandrapark.co.nz

Race information
- Distance: 1609m
- Surface: Dirt
- Track: Right-handed oval
- Qualification: four-year-old horses
- Purse: NZ $110,000 (2024)

The Noel J Taylor Memorial Mile, often referred to as the "Noel Taylor Mile" or "Taylor Mile", is a Group One race for pacing horses raced at Alexandra Park, Auckland in New Zealand.

The Noel Taylor Mile is currently held over the distance of 1609 metres (one mile). From 2007 to 2018 it was raced over 1700m.

Traditionally the race was only for 4 year old pacers. However, from 2013 to 2015 the race was also open to five-year-olds. For the 2022 event it was opened up to all pacers.

As well as being a major event in its own right, it is also the key lead-up to the New Zealand Messenger run the following week.

The 2024 Noel Taylor Mile was won by the "free legged" nine-year-old Mach Shard, driven by a junior driver Crystal Hackett at odds of $151.

== Race results ==
Previous winners and placegetters of the Noel Taylor Mile include:

Year	Month	Winner	Owner(s)	Driver	Time (distance)	2nd	3rd
2026	Apr	The Lazarus Effect	Alabar Racing Syndicate 2022	Bob Butt	1:54.7 (1609m)	Got The Chocolates	Swayzee
2025	Apr	We Walk By Faith	Dennis and Mark Dunford	Matthew White	1:51.6 (1609m)	Republican Party	Rakero Rocket
2024	Apr	Mach Shard	Mrs K J Purdon, Mrs C Nausbaum, Mrs T L Whittaker	Crystal Hackett (J)	1:53.9 (1609m)	Don't Stop Dreaming	Merlin
2023	Apr	Akuta	Cullen Breeding Limited, Mark Purdon	Mark Purdon	1:53.80 (1609m)	Self Assured	Better Eclipse
2022	Apr	Spankem	Mrs G J Kennard, P I Kennard, Breckon Racing Syndicate, J A Gibbs MNZM, Mrs A Gibbs, G A Woodham, Mrs K J Woodham	Natalie Rasmussen	1:52.22 (1609m)	Hot And Treacherous	Self Assured
2021	Apr	Copy That	M W & Mrs M T Butterworth	Maurice McKendry	1:54.57 (1609m)	Bad To The Bone	Steel The Show
2019	Apr	Spankem	Mrs G J Kennard, P I Kennard, Breckon Racing Syndicate, J A Gibbs MNZM, Mrs A Gibbs, G A Woodham, Mrs K J Woodham	Natalie Rasmussen	1:53.4 (1609m)	Turn It Up	Mach Shard
2018	Apr	A G's White Socks	G P Hope, P G Laboyrie, P I Baken, Mrs V M Robertson, W R Stewart, Mrs C L Stewart, A R Pullar, Mrs B E Pullar	Ricky May	2:00.3 (1700m)	Eamon Maguire	Star Galleria
2017	Apr	Lazarus	Mrs G J Kennard, P I Kennard, Trevor Casey, K J Riseley	Mark Purdon	2:00.0 (1700m)	Waikiki Beach	Golden Goddess
2016	Apr	Field Marshal	Mrs SA Brown, S B Brown	Dexter Dunn	1:59.5 (1700m)	Tas Man Bromac	Robbie Burns
2015	Apr	Mossdale Conner	A G Affleck	Maurice McKendry	1:58.1 (1700m)	Border Control	Ohoka Punter
2014	May	Besotted	Lincoln Farms	Simon Lawson	2:00.0 (1700m)	Elios	Adore Me
2013	Apr	Christen Me	C J Roberts, V L Purdon	Dexter Dunn	2:01.5 (1700m)	Gold Ace	Bettor Cover Lover
2012	Apr	Terror to Love	T McDonald	Anthony Butt	2:03.3 (1700m)	Bettor Cover Lover	Gold Ace
2011	Apr	Gomeo Romeo	L T Henwood	David Butcher	2:04.0 (1700m)	Smiling Shard	Mach Banner
2010	Apr	Second Wind	G M Adlam	Gavin Smith	2:02.9 (1700m)	Sleepy Tripp	Bonavista Bay
2009	Apr	Auckland Reactor	Auckland Reactor Ltd	Blair Orange	2:01.8 (1700m)	Georgetown	Pembrook Benny
2008	Apr	Changeover	A.T.C. Trot 2006 Syndicate	David Butcher	2:03.7 (1700m)	Gotta Go Cullen	Mr Molly
2007	Apr	Divisive	C E Rixon	Peter Rixon	2:00.9 (1700m)	Power Of Tara	Monkey King
2006	Apr	Mainland Banner	Ian Dobson, S J Dobson, Lynne Umar	Ricky May	1:55.1 (1609m)	Baileys Dream	Hippity Hop
2005	Apr	V For	L Taylor, Mike Berger	Philip Butcher	1:55.7 (1609m)	Romeos Legend	Likmesiah
2004	Apr	Elsu	Mrs J Walters/Double Up Synd/Est D Hudson/Mrs P Small	David Butcher	1:55.0 (1609m)	London Legend	Miracle Man
2003	Apr	Just An Excuse	O Haines, Mrs I K Haines	Todd Mitchell	1:55.6 (1609m)	All Hart	Jagged Account
2002	Apr	Alert Motoring	Robert Reid Syndicate	Brent Mangos	1:54.1 (1609m)	Eagles Together	Franco Heir
2001	Mar	Cool Hand Luke	R S Croon/M Purdon/T R Vince/J H Seaton	Tony Herlihy	1:55.6 (1609m)	Tupelo Rose	Dancingonmoonlight
2000	Mar	Mac De Stroyer	N F MacFarlane, Mrs L M MacFarlane	Todd Macfarlane	1:54.6 (1609m)	Pocket Me	Classic Turbo
1999	Apr	Ho Wong	Mrs Susan McKendry	Maurice McKendry	1:55.7 (1609m)	New York Fella	Homin Hosed
1998	Apr	Scuse Me	J S Dalgety, Mrs V L Purdon	Frank Cooney	1:53.5 (1609m)	OK Royal	Kate's First
1997	Apr	Agua Caliente	D S & Mrs D E J Short, Mrs D E Woods, Miss S M Short	Glen Wolfenden	1:56.4 (1609m)	Captain Rufus	Acknowledge
1996	Feb	Surprise Package	Mrs K J Purdon	Tony Herlihy	1:55.6 (1609m)	Il Vicolo	Grinaldi
1995	Feb	The Suleiman	J P Green, T G Garelja	Michael Langdon	1:57.0 (1609m)	Rare Touch	Ermis
1994	Feb	Hitchcock	L Christensen, W Pengelly, J Richardson, N Taylor	Maurice McKendry	1:57.6 (1609m)	Montana Vance	Camberley Octane
1993	Feb	Tigerish	L A Turner, Mrs P L Turner	James Stormont	1:58.7 (1609m)	Kurahaupo Lord	San Sabriel
1992	Feb	Abdias	J Butcher, Mrs C M Butcher	Philip Butcher	1:55.0 (1609m)	Tartan Clansman	Air Supply
1991	Feb	Christopher Vance	R R Reid, Lorna Reid Syndicate, Mrs J C Reid	Tony Herlihy	1:55.4 (1609m)	Mark Hanover	Franco Ice
1990	Feb	Defoe	Club Classic Lucky 7 Syndicate	Robert Mitchell	1:56.9 (1609m)	National Glory	Franco Gold
1989	Feb	Kiwi Supreme	J M Cunningham	Stephen Dove	1:57.4 (1609m)	National Image	Speed King
1988	Mar	Elmer Gantry	T Milina, R Evans	Tony Milina	1:56.7 (1609m)	Tax Credit	Bold Sharvid
1987	Apr	Jay Bee's Fella	P R Smythe	Peter Wolfenden	1:56.8 (1609m)	Lord Lenny	Sharlene's Pride
1986	Mar	Master Mood	K L Williams, Mrs B A Williams, S F Wong, F B Wong	Kevin Williams	1:57.5 (1609m)	Quiet Touch	Kurahaupo Eden

== Other major races ==
- Auckland Trotting Cup
- Dominion Handicap
- Great Northern Derby
- New Zealand Messenger
- New Zealand Trotting Cup
- New Zealand Trotting Derby
- New Zealand Free For All
- Rowe Cup
- The Race by betcha
- Inter Dominion Pacing Championship
- Inter Dominion Trotting Championship
- Miracle Mile Pace

== See also ==
- Harness racing
- Harness racing in New Zealand
