= Anthony Butt =

New Zealand harness racer

Anthony Butt is a driver of standardbred racehorses in Australia and New Zealand.

Anthony is the son of Murray Butt who was a prominent horse trainer in Canterbury and the grandson of champion trainer and driver, Wes Butt. Anthony's mother, Jenny, is the daughter of leading trainer/driver Derek Jones(NZOM).His brother Tim Butt was a leading harness trainer in New Zealand before moving to Australia. Their brother Roddy was also an accomplished harness driver and trainer. His sister, Chrissy, is married to and a co-trainer with Cran Dalgety. Together they have become outstanding trainers with many group one wins.Their son Carter is a champion junior driver and multiple group member one winning driver.

Anthony and his brother Roddy were the first drivers to win the Australasian Young Drivers Series twice, his brother winning it consecutively.

Anthonys two children, Chris and Kimberley are heavily involved in racing with Kim being a multiple group one winning driver.

Anthony was associated with champions trotters Lyell Creek and Take A Moment, who, along with many other of his best drives, were trained by his brother Tim. He has won the Dominion Handicap eight times and has been inducted into the Inter Dominion Hall of Fame.

Butt has won the A G Hunter Cup seven times:

- Blossom Lady (1994 and 1995)
- Choice Achiever (2012)
- Mister DG (2004)
- Mr Feelgood (2009)
- Mah Sish (2013)
- Stunin Cullen (2011)

He has won the Dominion Handicap a record eight times:

- Lyell Creek (1999, 2000 and 2004)
- Mountbatten (2007)
- Simon Katz (1987)
- Take A Moment (2001 and 2003)
- Vulcan (2011)

Other top wins include:

- 1990 New Zealand Trotting Derby with Winning Blue Chip
- 1992 New Zealand Cup with Blossom Lady
- 1992 New Zealand Free For All with Blossom Lady
- 1996 Great Northern Derby with Lavros Star
- 1999 Auckland Cup with Happy Asset
- 2000, 2001 and 2004 Rowe Cup with Lyell Creek
- 2003 Rowe Cup with Take A Moment
- 2006 and 2007 New Zealand Cup with Flashing Red
- 2007 Auckland Cup with Flashing Red
- 2009 Great Northern Derby with Stunin Cullen
- 2018 Miracle Mile Pace with My Field Marshall.

From 2020 to 2021 he and fiancé Sonya Smith were private trainers for the large-scale harness owner, Emilio Rosati winning five Group 1 races and over $1.8 million in stakes with horses such as Wolf Stride, Boots Electric, Elite Stride and Perfect Stride.

In January 2023 Butt took over from Lance Justice as the president of the Victorian Trainers and Drivers Association.

In 2026 Butt revealed he was returning to New Zealand to work for Stonewall Stud.

== See also ==
- Harness racing in New Zealand
- Harness racing in Australia
