= Chokin =

New Zealand Standardbred racehorse

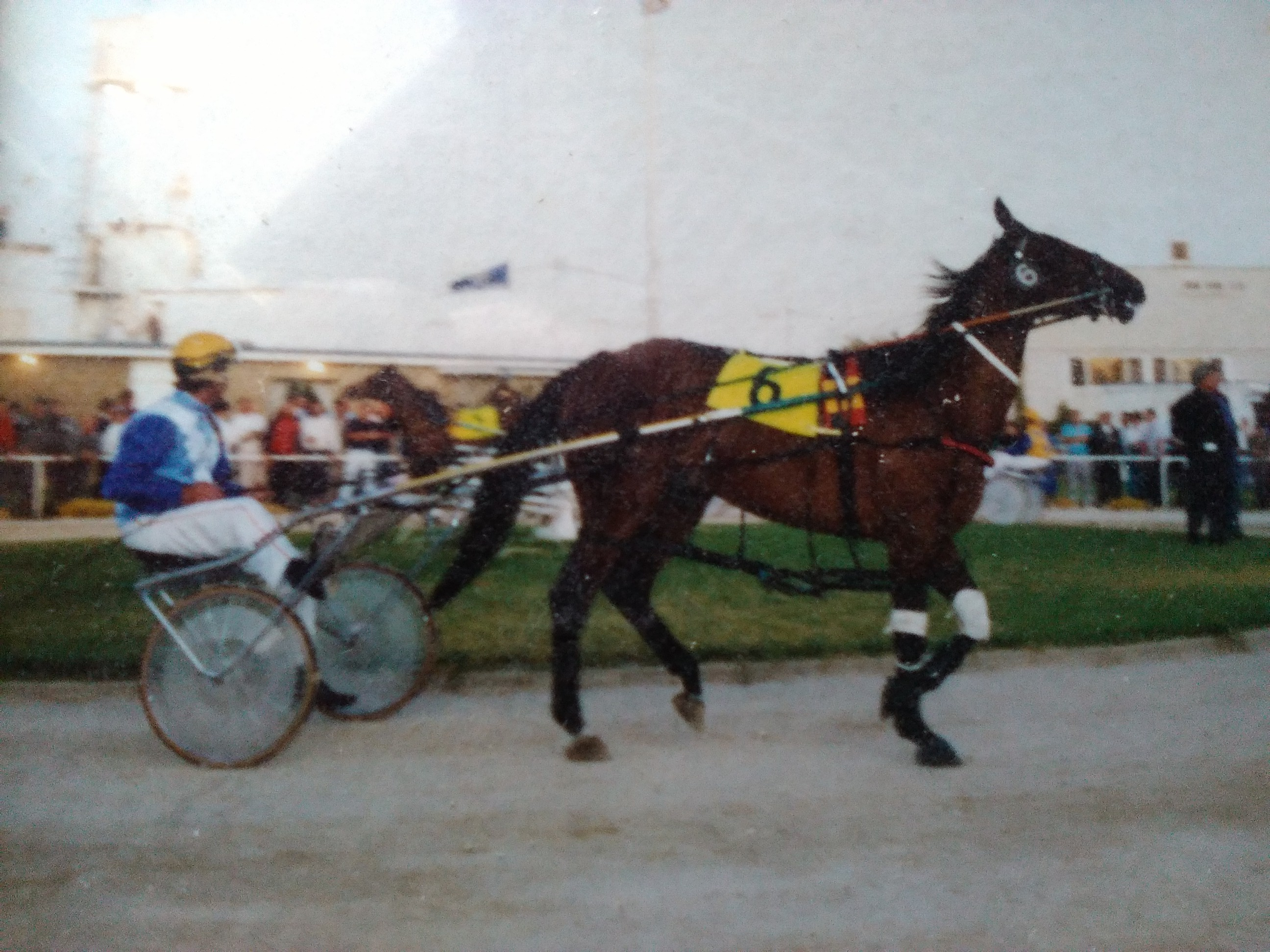
- Breed: Standardbred
- Sire: Vance Hanover (USA)
- Grandsire: Albatross (USA)
- Dam: Nell's Pride (NZ)
- Maternal grandsire: Tuft (USA)
- Sex: Gelding
- Foaled: 19 November 1988
- Died: 6 May 1995
- Country: New Zealand
- Colour: Bay
- Breeder: B Hughes & A S Meadows {NZ}
- Owner: Pacers Australia Syndicate, M Joyce, J Loughnan, B De Boer
- Trainer: Brian Hughes; Roy & Barry Purdon; Bob Knight

Record
- 59:34-7-4

Earnings
- NZ$1,801,685

Major wins
- New Zealand Sires Stakes 2yo Final (1991); New Zealand Sires Stakes 3yo Final (1991); South Australian Derby (1992); New Zealand Messenger (1993); Easter Cup (1993); New Zealand Trotting Cup (1993); New Zealand Free For All (1993); Miracle Mile Pace (1993 & 1994); Auckland Pacing Cup (1993 & 1994); Victoria Cup (1994)

Honours
- NZ 2-Year Old Pacer of the Year, Pacer of the Year & Horse Of The Year 1990/91; NZ 3-Year Old Pacer of the Year 1991/92; NZ 4-Year Old Pacer of the Year 1992/93; NZ Aged Pacer of the Year, Pacer of the Year and Horse of the Year 1993/94; New Zealand Trotting Hall of Fame Best mile rate, 1:56.2
- Last updated on: 2016-01-31.

Chokin is a New Zealand Standardbred racehorse who was notable in winning the New Zealand Trotting Cup, which is New Zealand's most prestigious horse race. Chokin is also one of the few horses to have won Harold Park Paceway's prestigious Miracle Mile Pace twice.

During his 2-year-old season in 1990/91 Chokin was sold to the Pacers Australia syndicate for about $200,000 and changed trainer from Brian Hughes to Roy and Barry Purdon. He had won 4 of 5 races before the sale. For his new owners he won the Sires Stakes Final by 4 ½ lengths in 1:56.5 which was a national record for his age. He also won the Two Year Old Championship over 2200 metres by 3 ½ lengths, again in national record time despite a rain affected track. He won 7 of 8 starts in his first season of racing, earned $205,390 and became the first two-year-old to be named New Zealand Horse of the Year.

Early in the 1991–92 season Chokin won the Rising Stars Championship at Addington running his last 800 metres in 55.4 seconds and last 400 metres in 26.9 seconds. He also won the New Zealand Sires Stakes 3yo Final and was undefeated in five starts in New Zealand. Chokin was invited to contest the Miracle Mile Pace in Sydney, the first time a three-year-old had been invited. He reacted badly to the crowd and atmosphere at Harold Park, galloped wildly at the start, and crashed to the track exhausted on the home turn. A start in the race was against the advice of his trainers. He won the South Australian Pacing Derby under the care of new Australian trainer Bob Knight but then suffered a tendon injury and returned to the Purdons in New Zealand. He won 3 of 5 Australian races for the season.

Chokin returned to racing in January 1993 and won only one of his first four starts with 1 second and 1 third. He then won the New Zealand Messenger Championship after being wide on the track for most of the race, the Flying Mile beating Christopher Vance and defeated Blossom Lady to win the Easter Cup. At the Inter Dominion in Brisbane he finished third and second in two of his three heats but a throat infection meant he was scratched from the final.

In 1993-94 Chokin won 4 of 9 New Zealand starts with 1 third placing. He won the New Zealand Trotting Cup defeating Master Musician and the New Zealand Free For All where he beat Master Musician and Christopher Vance. In the Miracle Mile Pace Chokin led throughout to win in the slow time of 2:00 after the controversial late scratching of Jack Morris with blood trickling from his nose. He then won the Auckland Pacing Cup by 1 ¼ lengths from Franco Ice with a further 3 ½ lengths to Christopher Vance in the time of 3:59.5. It was a national record and the first time 4 minutes had been broken for 3200 metres. In Melbourne Chokin then had an effortless win in the Victoria Cup from barrier eight where he beat Blossom Lady in a mile rate of 1:57.2 for 2380 metres. After a poor 10th in the A G Hunter Cup he was found to be suffering from a virus. At Harold Park Chokin finished first, fifth and second in his heats of the 1994 Inter Dominion Pacing Championship but was scratched from the final due to illness. He was named Horse of the Year in New Zealand.

At age six in 1994-95 Chokin was pulled up in the New Zealand Trotting Cup after stopping to a walk. It was the most stunning loss in New Zealand harness racing history. Chokin was still able to receive an invitation to the Miracle Mile Pace where he won beating Bee Bee Cee and Golden Reign joining Village Kid and Westburn Grant as dual winners of the race. At Alexandra Park, Auckland, he won the Auckland Pacing Cup for a second time from a 15-metre handicap beating Victor Supreme and Master Musician. It was his fifteenth Group 1 win in 17 Group 1 starts. Chokin was then ninth in the Victoria Cup. In the Inter Dominion at Addington, Christchurch he finished second, second and first in his heats. In the final Golden Reign beat Victor Supreme and Young Mister Charles but had to survive a 30-minute hearing after Blossom Lady suffered interference in the back straight the last time. Chokin finished fourth but was promoted to second after the original second and third finishers were disqualified after returning positive swabs.

Chokin died in May 1995 after suffering paralysis as a result of a stroke.

== Notable races ==
Chokin's races included:

Placing	Year	Race	1st	2nd	3rd
1st	1991	New Zealand 2yo Championship	Chokin	Butler's First	Giovanetto
1st	1991	New Zealand Sires Stakes 2yo Final	Chokin	Magic Fella	Giovanetto
1st	1991	New Zealand Sires Stakes 3yo Final	Chokin	Giovanetto	Clever Legend
1st	1992	South Australian Derby (Group 1, 2230m)	Chokin	Barossa Baron	Mark Apollo
1st	1993	New Zealand Messenger Championship	Chokin	Butler' First	San Sabriel
1st	1993	New Zealand Trotting Cup	Chokin	Master Musician	Giovanetto
1st	1993	New Zealand Free For All	Chokin	Master Musician	Christopher Vance
1st	1993	Miracle Mile Pace	Chokin	Sabilize	Master Musician
1st	1993	Auckland Pacing Cup	Chokin	Franco Ice	Christopher Vance
1st	1994	Victoria Cup	Chokin	Blossom Lady	Level Advice
1st	1994	Miracle Mile Pace	Chokin	Bee Bee Cee	Golden Reign
1st	1994	Auckland Pacing Cup	Chokin	Victor Supreme	Master Musician

== See also ==
- Harness racing
- Harness racing in New Zealand
