= Rowe Cup =

- Class: Group I
- Location: Alexandra Park; Auckland, New Zealand
- Inaugurated: 1918
- Race type: Standardbred - Flat racing
- Website: www.alexandrapark.co.nz

Race information
- Distance: 3200m (2 miles)
- Surface: Dirt
- Track: Right-handed oval
- Qualification: Three-year-olds and up
- Purse: NZ $200,000 (2025)

The Rowe Cup is a race held annually at Alexandra Park, Auckland, New Zealand for standardbred horses.

The Rowe Cup is run over a distance of 3200 m. Along with the Dominion Handicap raced at Addington Raceway it is one of the major harness races for trotters rather than pacers.

The Rowe Cup is currently held in early May on the same night as the Roy Purdon Memorial Handicap (Group 1) for pacers. Previously it was held later in May on the same night as the Auckland Cup and Northern Trotting Derby for 3 year old trotters. In 2024 Australian visitors Greg Sugars and Jess Tubbs won both Cups with Just Believe and Better Eclipse.

Between 1918 and 1971 it was raced in December.

== Records ==
Most wins:

- 3 - Lyell Creek (2000, 2001, 2004)

Most wins by a driver:

- 6 - Tony Herlihy (1991, 1997, 2007, 2009, 2017, 2022)
- 5 - Peter Wolfenden (1960, 1968, 1969, 1977, 1980)
- 4 - Anthony Butt (2000, 2001, 2003, 2004)
- 4 - Maurice McKendry (1986, 1992, 1993, 2008)
- 4 - J T Paul (1926, 1927, 1935, 1936)
- 4 - R Young (1946, 1949, 1950, 1952)
- 3 - M F Holmes (1956, 1959, 1961)
- 3 - L J Mahoney (1938, 1939, 1941)
- 3 - W Orange (1920, 1922, 1923)

== Winners list ==
The following are winners of the Rowe Cup:

Year	Horse	Hcp	Owner(s)	Driver	Time	2nd	3rd
2026	Mr Love	fr (7)	Greg & Nina Hope	Ben Hope	4:07.3	Oscar Bonavena	Hillbilly Blues
2025	Bet N Win	fr (1)	Odds On Syndicate, P I Baken, R Cole, P I & G J Kennard Bloodstock Limited, Breckon Racing Syndicate, Mrs M J White, C J Markham, A Di lorio, Est W A Ramsay, P I Marriott	Bob Butt	4:06:5	Mr Love	Queen Elida
2024	Just Believe	fr (6)	Iona Trotter Syndicate	Greg Sugars	4:06.1	Oscar Bonavena	Midnight Dash
2023	Love N The Port	fr (1)	K P Ussher & Mrs S E White	Matthew Williamson	4:06.84	Oscar Bonavena	Eurokash
2022	Bolt For Brilliance	fr (2)	Mrs S Herlihy, D I Donaldson, P J Hailes, Mrs J M Mathews	Tony Herlihy	4:01.24	Temporale	Sundees Son
2021	Sundees Son	fr	Colin & Nancy Hair	John Dunn	4:06.61	Bolt For Brilliance	Temporale
2019	Sundees Son	fr	Colin & Nancy Hair	John Dunn	4:06.2	Speeding Spur	Majestic Man
2018	Speeding Spur	fr	Woodlands Partnership, Kieran Read, Andy Ellis, R J Taylor, D Hewett	Joshua Dickie	4:08.2	Monty Python	Temporale
2017	Temporale	fr	D P Biddlecombe, D I Donaldson, Mrs S Herlihy, K J Riseley	Tony Herlihy	4:07.9	Habibti Ivy	Bordeaux
2016	Monbet	fr	Greg Hope, Nina Hope, M J Molloy	Ricky May	4:06.3	Valmagne	Queen Kenny
2015	Stent	fr	Trevor Casey	Colin DeFilippi	4:03.6	Master Lavros	Alley Way
2014	Master Lavros	fr	Kypros Kotzikas	Mark Jones	4:06.4	Sheemon	Boizel
2013	Stig	fr	T G Butt, Mrs Andrea Butt, J S Boyd, Mrs R I Boyd, R G Thomas, Ms J A Gordon	David Butt	4:06.1	Springbank Sam	Boizel
2012	I Can Doosit	fr	Ken & Karen Breckon	Mark Purdon	4:05.0	Springbank Richard	Dr Hook
2011	I Can Doosit	fr	Ken & Karen Breckon	Mark Purdon	4:08.2	Dr Hook	Raydon
2010	Sundon's Gift	fr	Neven Botica	Chris Lang	4:08.5	Stylish Monarch	Leighton Hest
2009	One Over Kenny	fr	L E Williams, Mrs H R Williams	Tony Herlihy	4:07.0	Springbank Richard	Cornishman
2008	Our Sunny Whiz	fr	R A, R M & K A Southey, Mrs S D Lean	Maurice McKendry	4:12.4	Lotsa Speed	Braig
2007	One Over Kenny	fr	L E & Mrs. H R Williams	Tony Herlihy	4:09.0	Our Sunny Whiz	Summer Man
2006	Inspire	fr	Red And White Syndicate, R G H Thomson, G J & P C Nairn	Paul Nairn	4:13.0	Rosscoe	Romper Stomper
2005	Martina H	fr	K D Marr, I D Malcolm, Derek Balle	Derek Balle	4:09.4	Delft	Young Pointer
2004	Lyell Creek	fr	Mrs K L Butt, Graham Bruton, The Creek Syndicate	Anthony Butt	4:07.7	Young Pointer	Sophocles
2003	Take A Moment	fr	Long Drive Syndicate	Anthony Butt	4:08.0	Martina H	Cordon Rouge
2002	La Coocaracha	15 m	L J & S Christou/B Meani/G Meani	Kerryn Manning	4:05.3	Frugal Echo	Major Decision
2001	Lyell Creek	15 m	A M Butt, Graham Bruton, The Creek Syndicate	Anthony Butt	4:06.0	Fleur's Invasion	Last Sunset
2000	Lyell Creek	15 m	Graham Bruton	Anthony Butt	4:05.8	Sundon's Way	Special Force
1999	Mountain Gold	fr	The Dual Code Syndicate	Barry Purdon	4:13.8	Miss Whiplash	Sundowner Bay
1998	Merinai	10 m	J F Bedwell, Miss A M Bedwell, Mrs M E Hill	James Stormont	4:08.6	McGrady	Buster Hanover
1997	Eastburn Grant	fr	L A Barnett	Ken Barron	4:08.8		
1996	Wagon Apollo	fr	N G Aitken, D V Lang	Graeme Lang	4:09.5		
1995	So Long Eden	fr	Ms M J Millar, W J Bishop	Colin De Filippi	4:06.7		
1994	Diamond Field	10 m	Southland St'Breds No 2 Syndicate	Tony Herlihy	4:15.6		
1993	David Moss	fr	Est H W Cox, O Andersen	Maurice McKendry	4:09.8		
1992	Directorship	fr	Classic Nine Syndicate	Maurice McKendry	4:13.5		
1991	Gee du Jour	fr	A D Cain, S J Adlam, J A Lischner	Tony Herlihy	4:12.3		
1990	Idle Scott	fr	R F Hunt, M K Chubb, G R Mason, D K Gibbons	Dave Gibbons	4:10.8		
1989	Yankee Loch	fr	D K Gibson, Mrs R M Gibson	Jim Curtin	4:14.0		
1988	Highwood	fr	W E Stapleton, L J Hanrahan	Ricky May	4:14.4		
1987	Landora's Pride	fr	C T Allingham, Mrs V M Allingham	John Langdon	4:12.8		
1986	Mairo Sultan	Fr	K Miller, Mrs J P Miller	Maurice McKendry	4:19.3		
1985	Tussle	fr	Dr C H G Irvine	Peter N Jones	4:20.6		
1984	Jenner	fr	Kenwood Syndicate	John Langdon	4:13.6		
1983	Sir Castleton	fr	M S MacPherson	Patrick G O'Reilly jnr	4:17.0		
1982	Stormy Morn	15m	P G Moore	A J (Tony) Perucich	4:25.3		
1981	No Response	10m	F T N Black	Richard J Brosnan	4:18.2		
1980	Special Pride	fr	P J & Mrs M C Harnett	Peter Wolfenden	4:24.6		
1979	Even Speed	fr	I H Langford & Dr B W Nixon	Wes Butt	4:22.0		
1978	Ritch Hill	fr	E W & T R Running	Bruce Running	4:21.0		
1977	Framalda	10m	A L Daly & F L H Mooney	Peter Wolfenden	4:17.9		
1976	Easton Light	40m	E W & T R Running	Bruce Running	4:19.4		
1975	Robyn Evander	fr	P Butterworth & J E Smith	Jim Smith	4:22.5		
1974	Cee Ar	fr	R H De Filippi & V Ford	Denis Nyhan	4:17.3		
1973	Miss Debra	12 yds	J R Longville, V Nicholson & G Wood	H P (Paddy) Timmins	4:25.8		
1971	Paulette	scr	A Gibbon	Dave Gibbons	4:36.4		
1970	Global Hall	scr	R D Butt & E Gaffaney	Robin D Butt	4:18.6		
1969	Single Cash	30 yds	S R Landon & L E B File	Peter Wolfenden	4:19.2		
1968	Single Cash	12 yds	S R Landon & L E B File	Peter Wolfenden	4:22.4		
1967	Mountain Pride	scr	J E Smith & Estate L J Ashworth	Jim Smith	4:23.4		
1966	Scotleigh	scr	C R Griffin	Cecil R Griffin	4:21.4		
1965	Astralight	12 yds	W F Woolley	Jack Carmichael	4:25.0		
1964	Dreaming	scr	A H Edge	Colin McDonald	4:23.0		
1963	Pohutukawa	24 yds	R J & G M Oliver	Doody Townley	4:18.6		
1962	Pohutukawa	36 yds	R J & G M Oliver	Robert J Oliver	4:21.6		
1961	Ordeal	78 yds	Mrs L M Bradley	M Holmes	4:14.0		
1960	Jewel Derby	72 yds	E C Parker	Peter Wolfenden	4:27.0		
1959	Recruit	78 yds	J J Rooney	M Holmes	4:24.8		
1958	Battle Cry	72 yds	Mrs & E S Baxter	Wes Butt	4:21.2		
1957	Tapuwae	scr	Mrs M Adam	Lawrence Greenaway	4:32.8		
1956	Recruit	132 yds	J Rooney	M Holmes	4:20.4		
1955	Indian Parrish	12 yds	A Ogilvie	O Nicholas	4:31.6		
1954	Quick Silver	24 yds	Mrs J N Oliver	W K Tatterson	4:30.4		
1953	Rewa Scott	36 yds	W A Craddock & R Curragh	D Jones	4:27.0		
1952	Indomitable	scr	W E Hyslop	R Young	4:30.6		
1951	Fair Isle	36 yds	V Alborn & E J August	V Alborn	4:27.6		
1950	Gay Belwyn	60 yds	Mrs E A Berryman	R Young	4:30.6		
1949	Single Task	12 yds	Brownson Bros	R Young	4:26.0		
1948	Bellisima	72 yds	W E Sticking	C R Berkett	4:44.0		
1947	Noble Star	scr	J Mearn	A W Broughton	4:32.0		
1946	Aerial Scott	24 yds	J Spier	R Young	4:45.0		
1945	Casablanca	72 yds	S T Webster	J B Pringle	4:34.0		
1944	Fantom	24 yds	J R McKenzie	G B Noble	4:33.0		
1943	Douglas McElwyn	36 yds	L F Berkett	L F Berkett	4:33.6		
1942	Fantom	scr	J R McKenzie	G B Noble	4:35.4		
1941	Jimmy Drusus	scr	P V Flexman	L J Mahoney	4:42.0		
1940	Margin	scr	C Moran	C Moran	4:40.0		
1939	Gay Moko	36 yds	J Mahoney	L J Mahoney	4:41.4		
1938	Pirate's Last	60 yds	J Mahoney	L J Mahoney	4:39.2		
1937	Parrish Belle	36 yds	A G Pillinger	A G Pillinger	4:34.6		
1936	Great Admiral	48 yds	J T Paul	J T Paul	4:33.0		
1935	Great Admiral	60 yds	J T Paul	J T Paul	4:36.0		
1934	Nell Volo	108 yds	F J Smith	F J Smith	4:26.4		
1933	Nell Volo	scr	F J Smith	F J Smith	4:41.0		
1932	Garner	scr	E C McDermot	E C McDermott	3:27.0 (1.5 miles)		
1931	Surprise Journey	96 yds	G J Barton	W J Tomkinson	4:32.6		
1930	Raima	24 yds	J H Lloyd	J A Gerrard	4:34.0		
1929	Raima	scr	J H Lloyd	J J Kennerly	4:45.2		
1928	Kempton	scr	Mrs E Berryman	C S Donald	4:40.4		
1927	Waikaha	12 yds	J T Paul	J T Paul	4:36.6		
1926	Waikaha	24 yds	J T Paul	J T Paul	4:37.8		
1925	Rose Bingen	36 yds	C Johnstone	W Willietts	4:36.0		
1924	Pyramus	24 yds	F J Rayner	A J Julian	4:44.4		
1923	Mutu	scr	A W Jones	W Orange	4:44.0		
1922	Aerial Bingen	36 yds	J Pettie	W Orange	4:45.8		
1921	Native King	24 yds	B Shadbolt	B Shadbolt Jnr	4:46.0		
1920	Grattan Abbey	scr	W Orange	W Orange	4:48.0		
1919	Bluewood	scr	R M Morten	J Bryce	4:54.6		
1918	Whist	48 yds	J R Corrigan	A Adams	4:48.4		

There was no race in 2020 due to COVID-19 restrictions.

== Other major races ==
- Dominion Handicap
- Inter Dominion Trotting Championship
- Inter Dominion Pacing Championship
- Auckland Trotting Cup
- New Zealand Trotting Cup
- Great Northern Derby
- Noel J Taylor Mile
- New Zealand Messenger

== See also ==
- Harness racing in New Zealand
