= Roy Purdon =

New Zealand harness-racing trainer (1927–2022)

Roy Purdon MBE
- Born: Roy Cleveland Purdon; 16 February 1927; Auckland, New Zealand
- Died: 2 February 2022 (aged 94); Auckland, New Zealand
- Occupation: Harness-racing trainer
- Spouse: Margaret Hughes (m. 1954; died 2015)
- Children: 4
- Relatives: Mark Purdon (son); Tony Herlihy (son-in-law)
- Horse racing career
- Sport: Horse racing

Significant horses
- Chokin; Christopher Vance; Comedy Lad; Framalda; Hi Foyle; Luxury Liner; Melton Monarch; Petite Evander; Scottish Charm; Sole Command

Roy Cleveland Purdon MBE (16 February 1927 – 2 February 2022) was a notable New Zealand harness-racing trainer. He was New Zealand's leading trainer in 21 seasons, either on his own or in partnership with his son, Barry.

== Early life and family ==
Purdon was born in the Auckland suburb of Freemans Bay on 16 February 1927, the son of Hugh Purdon, a Scottish immigrant. At the age of 14, he suffered an injury while playing rugby that resulted in his spending six weeks in hospital and six months with a cast around his hips, and left him with a permanent limp.

In 1954, Purdon married Margaret Hughes, and the couple went on to have four children, including sons, harness-racing trainers Barry and Mark Purdon, and daughter Suzanne, who married harness-racing driver Tony Herlihy.

== Harness racing ==
Purdon began training with his father on a 400-metre track in New Lynn, but it was from the 1970s until 1995 that he dominated harness racing in New Zealand and Australia. Over that period, he wom the New Zealand premiership for leading trainer 21 times, on his own or in partnership with son Barry. The pair trained four New Zealand cup winners: Sole Command in 1977; Luxury Liner in 1988; Christopher Vance in 1991; and finally Chokin in 1993. In total, Purdon recorded 2019 race wins in New Zealand—1463 with Barry and 556 in his own right—including 54 Group One wins, as well as many more in Australia.

In the 1989 New Year Honours, Purdon was appointed a Member of the Order of the British Empire, for services to harness racing.

== Later life and death ==
Purdon retired from training in 1995. He died in Middlemore Hospital, Auckland, on 2 February 2022, aged 94, having been predeceased by his wife, Margaret, in 2015.
