= Great Evander =

New Zealand Standardbred racehorse

- Breed: Standardbred
- Sire: Bill B Scott (USA)
- Grandsire: Single G (USA)
- Dam: Ayrshire Scott (NZ)
- Maternal grandsire: U Scott (USA)
- Sex: Stallion
- Foaled: 1 Sep 1952
- Country: New Zealand
- Colour: Bay
- Breeder: J S Herring (NZ)
- Last updated on: 2009-04-27.

Great Evander was a New Zealand standardbred racehorse and sire. Great Evander was by Bill B Scott out of Ayrshire Scott. As a notable champion sire, he was inducted into the New Zealand Trotting Hall of Fame.

A dual purpose sire, Great Evander produced 149 winners in New Zealand, 101 trotting winners and 48 pacing winners.

== Progeny ==
- Petite Evander
- Easton Light

== See also ==
- Harness racing in New Zealand
