= Easton Light =

New Zealand Standardbred racehorse

- Breed: Standardbred
- Sire: Great Evander (NZ)
- Grandsire: Bill B (USA)
- Dam: Beverley Light
- Maternal grandsire: Light Brigade
- Sex: Gelding
- Foaled: 1 September 1964
- Country: New Zealand
- Colour: Bay

Earnings
- $132,370

Major wins
- 1972 Dominion Handicap; 1974 Dominion Handicap; 1976 Rowe Cup

Honours
- First trotter in ANZ to earn $100,000
- Last updated on: 24 October 2011.

Easton Light was a New Zealand Standardbred trotter. He was inducted into the New Zealand Trotting Hall of Fame with other immortals. A notable achievement was winning the Rowe Cup, the top event in New Zealand for trotting horses. He also won the Dominion Handicap twice, the other premier event for trotting horses.

Easton Light had the following big race wins:

- 1972 Dominion Handicap
- 1974 Dominion Handicap (Handicap of 30 metres)
- 1976 Rowe Cup (Handicap of 40 metres)

== See also ==
- Harness racing in New Zealand
- Petite Evander
- Lyell Creek
- Take A Moment
