= Just An Excuse =

New Zealand Standardbred racehorse

- Breed: Standardbred
- Sire: Live Or Die (US)
- Grandsire: Die Laughing
- Dam: My Excuse
- Maternal grandsire: Smooth Fella (US)
- Sex: Gelding
- Foaled: 4 December 1998
- Died: 30 June 2008 (aged 9)
- Country: New Zealand
- Trainer: Robert F. Mitchell (NZ)

Record
- 39 starts: 17 wins, 15 placings

Earnings
- NZ$1,047,157
- Last updated on: 5 November 2021.

Just An Excuse (4 December 1998 – 30 June 2008) was a champion New Zealand Standardbred racehorse, notable for twice winning the New Zealand Trotting Cup, in 2003 and 2004.

== Racing career ==
Bred by Ollie and Irene Haines, trained by Robert Mitchell, and driven by Todd Mitchell, Just An Excuse won the following major races in New Zealand and Australia:

- 2004 New Zealand Free For All, beating Mister D G and Jagged Account
- 2004 New Zealand Trotting Cup, beating Elsu and Howard Bromac
- 2004 Ballarat Cup, beating Sokyola and Double Identity
- 2003 New Zealand Trotting Cup beating Elsu and Jack Cade
- 2003 New Zealand Messenger Championship, beating Sly Flyin and All Hart
- 2003 Noel J Taylor Memorial Mile, beating All Hart and Jagged Account

Just An Excuse was also placed:

- third in the 2005 New Zealand Trotting Cup behind Mainland Banner and Alta Serena
- second in the 2003 Auckland Pacing Cup behind Elsu

It was a testament to his class that he won the two New Zealand Cups and the New Zealand Free For All in spite of top-class competitors such as Elsu and Mister D G.

Just An Excuse died on 30 June 2008, needing to be put down after he broke his leg.

== See also ==
- Harness racing in New Zealand
