= Petite Evander =

New Zealand Standardbred racehorse

- Breed: Standardbred
- Sire: Great Evander (NZ)
- Grandsire: Bill B
- Dam: Thearle (NZ)
- Maternal grandsire: Light Brigade
- Sex: Mare
- Foaled: 1 September 1970
- Country: New Zealand
- Colour: Bay
- Breeder: Frank "Snow" Weaver
- Owner: Frank "Snow" Weaver
- Trainer: Roy Purdon

Record
- 142 starts: 35 wins, 26 seconds, 16 thirds

Earnings
- $765,842

Honours
- New Zealand Trotting Hall of Fame inductee
- Last updated on: 24 October 2011.

Petite Evander was a New Zealand bred Standardbred trotting racemare. She developed into a successful racehorse, winning races in New Zealand, Australia and the United States, and was the dam of dual Inter Dominion Trotting Championship winner Pride Of Petite. As a notable champion, she was inducted into the New Zealand Trotting Hall of Fame.

== See also ==
- Harness racing in New Zealand
- Easton Light
- Lyell Creek
- Take A Moment
