= Charlie Hunter (trainer) =

New Zealand racehorse trainer and driver

Charlie Hunter or C S Hunter was a trainer and driver of standardbred racehorses in New Zealand.

He was associated with the champion pacer Young Quinn.

Hunter topped the New Zealand trainer's list in the 1967/68 and 1973/74 seasons, and was first equal in the 1974/75 season.

He also drove winners such as:

- French Pass, winner of the 1967 Dominion Handicap
- Min Scott, winner of the 1963 Dominion Handicap
- Scottish Warrior, winner of the 1972 New Zealand Messenger Championship

== See also ==
- Harness racing in New Zealand
