= New Zealand Messenger Championship =

- Class: Group I
- Location: Alexandra Park; Auckland, New Zealand
- Inaugurated: 1967
- Race type: Standardbred - Flat racing
- Website: www.alexandrapark.co.nz

Race information
- Distance: 2700m
- Surface: Dirt
- Track: Right-handed oval
- Qualification: Open class pacers, from 2022 onwards (Historically for four-year-old pacers only)
- Purse: NZ $100,000 (2025)

The New Zealand Messenger Championship is a Group One event for standardbred pacing horses in New Zealand, run at Alexandra Park.

== History ==
The New Zealand Messenger Championship had traditionally been restricted to 4 year-old horses and was the most prestigious race for that age group in New Zealand, and a key guide to feature races in the following season like the New Zealand Trotting Cup and Auckland Cup. This is evidenced by many New Zealand Messenger Championship winners or placegetters subsequently becoming Cup victors, such as:

- Auckland Reactor
- Changeover
- Chokin
- Christopher Vance
- Elsu
- Just An Excuse
- Lazarus
- Mainland Banner
- Monkey King
- Royden Glen
- Stanley Rio
- Yulestar

For the 2013, 2014 and 2015 years five year olds were also eligible to compete in the race. Then from 2016 it reverted to four year olds only. However, in 2022 the New Zealand Messenger and its traditional lead up race, the Noel J Taylor Mile, were both opened up to older horses.

The New Zealand Messenger was previously raced on the same race-night as the Rowe Cup and Northern Trotting Derby for trotters and the New Zealand Sires Stakes Championship. In recent years the race has been held in late April or early May.

== Race results ==
Previous winners and placegetters are as follows. There was no race in 2020 due to COVID-19 restrictions.

Year	Month	Horse	Owner(s)	Driver	Time	2nd	3rd
2026	May	Got The Chocolates	R K Gordon, Mrs A L Gordon	John Dunn	3:13.8	The Lazarus Effect	Swayzee (horse)
2025	Apr	Republican Party	Mrs C M Dalgety, G E Dickey, Mrs J E Rooney, G A Ayers, First Term Syndicate, D A Schollum, K J Cummings, B A Smith, G P Merlo, A & M Syndicate	Carter Dalgety	3:18.8	Mo'unga	Don't Stop Dreaming
2024	May	Mach Shard	Mrs K J Purdon, Mrs C Nausbaum, Mrs T L Whittaker	Crystal Hackett (J)	3:17.71	Self Assured	Better Eclipse
2023	Apr	Self Assured	Mrs J L Feiss	Natalie Rasmussen	3:18.8	Copy That	Better Eclipse
2022	Apr	Majestic Cruiser	D S Glynn & Mrs H R Glynn	Cameron Hart	3:13.1	Self Assured	A G's White Socks
2021	Apr	Copy That	M W & M T Butterworth	Maurice McKendry	3:18.81	Bad To The Bone	Amazing Dream
2019	May	Spankem	Mrs GJ Kennard, PI Kennard, Breckon Racing Syndicate, JA Gibbs MNZM, Mrs A Gibbs, GA Woodham, Mrs KJ Woodham	Natalie Rasmussen	3:17.6	Turn It Up	Mach Shard
2018	Apr	Eamon Maguire	BD Sceats, GJ Anderson, R Chalklin, SR Pulley, AD Gow, Mrs PP Gillan	Natalie Rasmussen	3:15.7	Star Galleria	A G's White Socks
2017	Apr	Lazarus	Mrs GJ Kennard, PI Kennard, TG Casey, KJ Riseley	Mark Purdon	3:25.2	Waikiki Beach	Golden Goddess
2016	Apr	Field Marshal	Mrs S A Brown, S B Brown	Dexter Dunn	3:15.8	My Kiwi Mate	Hug The Wind
2015	Apr	Sky Major	Mrs K J Purdon, T G Casey, Clear View Racing No 4 Syndicate, J Lohman, T F Henderson, The Anzac Racing Syndicate	Zac Butcher	3:15.6	Tiger Tara	Ohoka Punter
2014	May	Elios	Bennett Bloodstock Ltd, C Eynon, M R McKinnon, G Rutledge, B Destounis	John Dunn	3:17.4	Franco Nelson	Norvic Nightowl
2013	May	Christen Me	C J Roberts, V L Purdon	Dexter Dunn	3:17.7	Jason Rulz	Lets Elope
2012	May	Mustang Mach	K Farah, A Kheir, G Braude, M Gordon	Dexter Dunn	3:18.0	Gold Ace	State Of Affairs
2011	May	Franco Emirate	R E Nieper	Jim Curtin	3:18.0	Mach Banner	Gomeo Romeo
2010	May	Tintin In America	ATC Trot 2008 Syndicate	David Butcher	3:15.8	Bonavista Bay	Harley Earl
2009	May	Auckland Reactor	Auckland Reactor Ltd	Mark Purdon	3:18.8	Ohoka Dallas	All Tiger
2008	May	Gotta Go Cullen	Ian Dobson	Tony Herlihy	3:22.9	Changeover	Victory Spirit
2007	May	Monkey King	Cavalla Bloodstock Limited	Steven Reid	3:23.9	Divisive	All Promises
2006	May	Mainland Banner	Ian Dobson, S J Dobson, Lynne Umar	Ricky May	3:23.5	Mr Williams	Baileys Dream
2005	April	Mi Muchacho	R C Anderson, Ms P C Larsen	Peter Ferguson	3:23.5	Likmesiah	Winforu
2004	April	Elsu	Mrs J Walters/Double Up Synd/Est D Hudson/Mrs P Small	David Butcher	3:22.2	London Legend	Napoleon
2003	May	Just An Excuse	O Haines, Mrs I K Haines	Todd Mitchell	3:22.0	Sly Flyin	All Hart
2002	April	Young Rufus	H Manolitsis, V, T & W Lynch, G J Carey, K R Hyslop	Mark Purdon	3:21.4	Eagles Together	Parisian Falcon
2001	March	Tupelo Rose	G L Banks, M J Hanover, J D Curtin	Peter Jones	3:23.6	Gracious Knight	Falcon Rise
2000	March	Pic Me Pockets	H R Bosher	Tony Herlihy	3:19.8	Classic Turbo	Mac De Stroyer
1999	April	Homin Hosed	Mrs M A Macey, B L Macey	Todd Mitchell	3:23.1	Holmes D G	Yulestar
1998	May	OK Royal	Jack Smolenski, M J Ward	Jack Smolenski	3:20.6	Kliklite	Liminka Lad
1997	April	Agua Caliente	D S Short, Mrs D E J Short, Mrs D E Woods, Miss S M Short	Glen Wolfenden	3:24.7	Adio Routine	Captain Rufus
1996	April	Decision Time	J M Ward	James Stormont	3:22.3	Grinaldi	Ultra Soky
1995	April	Rain Again	B C Madsen	Neil Brady	3:23.0	Just Royce	Ginger Man
1994	April	Montana Vance	J B Hart, Mrs K J Purdon, J B Ede, D H Sixton	Tony Herlihy	3:23.0	Camberley Octane	Nippon Home
1993	March	Chokin	Pacers Australia Synd, M Joyce, J Loughnan, B De Boer	Tony Herlihy	3:23.3	Butler's First	San Sabriel
1992	April	Abdias	J Butcher, Mrs C M Butcher	Philip Butcher	3:27.0	Tartan Clansman	Smooth Gretna
1991	April	Christopher Vance	R R Reid, Lorna Reid Syndicate, Mrs J C Reid	Tony Herlihy	3:19.5	Franco Ice	Mark Hanover
1990	March	Alert Fulla	J Friedhof	Maurice McKendry	3:25.8	Inky Lord	Defoe
1989	March	Dillon Dean	D P Dwyer, Mrs H M C Burley	Colin De Filippi	3:22.7	Surmo Way	Reba Lord
1988	February	Rostriever Hanover	I A Munro, Mrs A H Munro	Patrick O'Reilly	3:23.5	Speedy Cheval	Elmer Gantry
1986	December	Trident	The Horseplayers Syndicate	John Hay	3:25.8	Captain Cavalla	Free's Best
1985	December	Placid Victor	Mrs L G Wilson	Maurice McKendry	3:23.2	Luxury Liner	Quiet Touch
1984	December	Roydon Glen	R A McKenzie	Fred Fletcher	3:25.4	Comedy Lad	King Alba
1983	December	Nostradamus	W J Francis & P I Renwick	Peter N Jones	3:32.4	Mighty Me	Borana
1982	December	Hilarious Guest	M G Vermeulen	Peter Wolfenden	3:26.2	Sharvid Skipper	Enterprise
1981	December	Melton Monarch	Jim Dalgety	Barry Purdon	3:26.5	Te Puke Expects	El Regale
1980	December	John Tudor	H T & A P Dodds & B C Newton	Thomas H Knowles	3:29.3	Wickliffe	Frosty Lopez
1979	December	Tempest Tiger	P K Ryder	Jack Smolenski	3:27.9	Genesis	Kane
1978	December	Locarno	B J & E J Francis	Robin D Butt	3:34.6	Gerry Junior	Watbro
1978	March	Sapling	G C Cruickshank & R Given	Henry Skinner	3:26.4	Scottish Heath	Lancia
1977	March	Stanley Rio	W J Francis & G B & J B Noble	John B Noble	3:28.4	Trusty Scot	Anne's Day
1976	March	Forto Prontezza	Mrs E & A R J McNaught	Henry Skinner	3:29.2	Sole Command	Final Curtain
1975	March	Josias	J & Mrs C M Butcher	Robert F Mitchell	3:29.6	Captain Harcourt	David Garrison
1974	March	Speedy Guest	W F Woolley	Jack Smolenski	3:28.8	Scottish Foil	Hill Crest
1973	March	Tonton Macoute	N M Allcock & W E Ross	A K Holmes	3:10	Ava Hanover	Double Cash
1972	March	Scottish Warrior	R A McKenzie	Charlie Hunter	3:10.2	Morpheus	Rossi Gennari
1970	December	Sam Tryax	Mrs & R C Whitford	Barry J Anderson	3:11.6	False Dream	Celtic Lord
1969	December	Western Ridge	T E Renshaw	Reg J Weatherley	3:14.2	Courtnal	Via Veneto
1968	December	Bewitched	G B Noble	John B Noble	2:55.8	Light Forbes	Henry Allan
1967	December	Governor Frost	C Hadley	Peter Wolfenden	2:55.4	Cingalese	Cheeky

== Other major races ==
- Auckland Trotting Cup
- Dominion Handicap
- Great Northern Derby
- New Zealand Trotting Cup
- Noel J Taylor Mile
- Rowe Cup
- The Race by betcha
- Inter Dominion Pacing Championship
- Inter Dominion Trotting Championship
- Miracle Mile Pace

== See also ==
- Harness racing in New Zealand
- Harness racing
