= Harness racing in New Zealand =

Harness racing in New Zealand is primarily a professional sport which involves pacing and trotting competitions for Standardbred racehorses. The difference is the horse's gait or running style:

- pacing is where the two legs on the same side of the horse move forward at the same time, and
- trotting is where the horse moves its two diagonally opposite legs forward at the same time.

In New Zealand the majority of standardbred races are for pacers and the most lucrative races are in that gait. Pacers are generally faster than trotters. However, harness racing is still often called trotting as that was the sport's traditional name.

== History ==
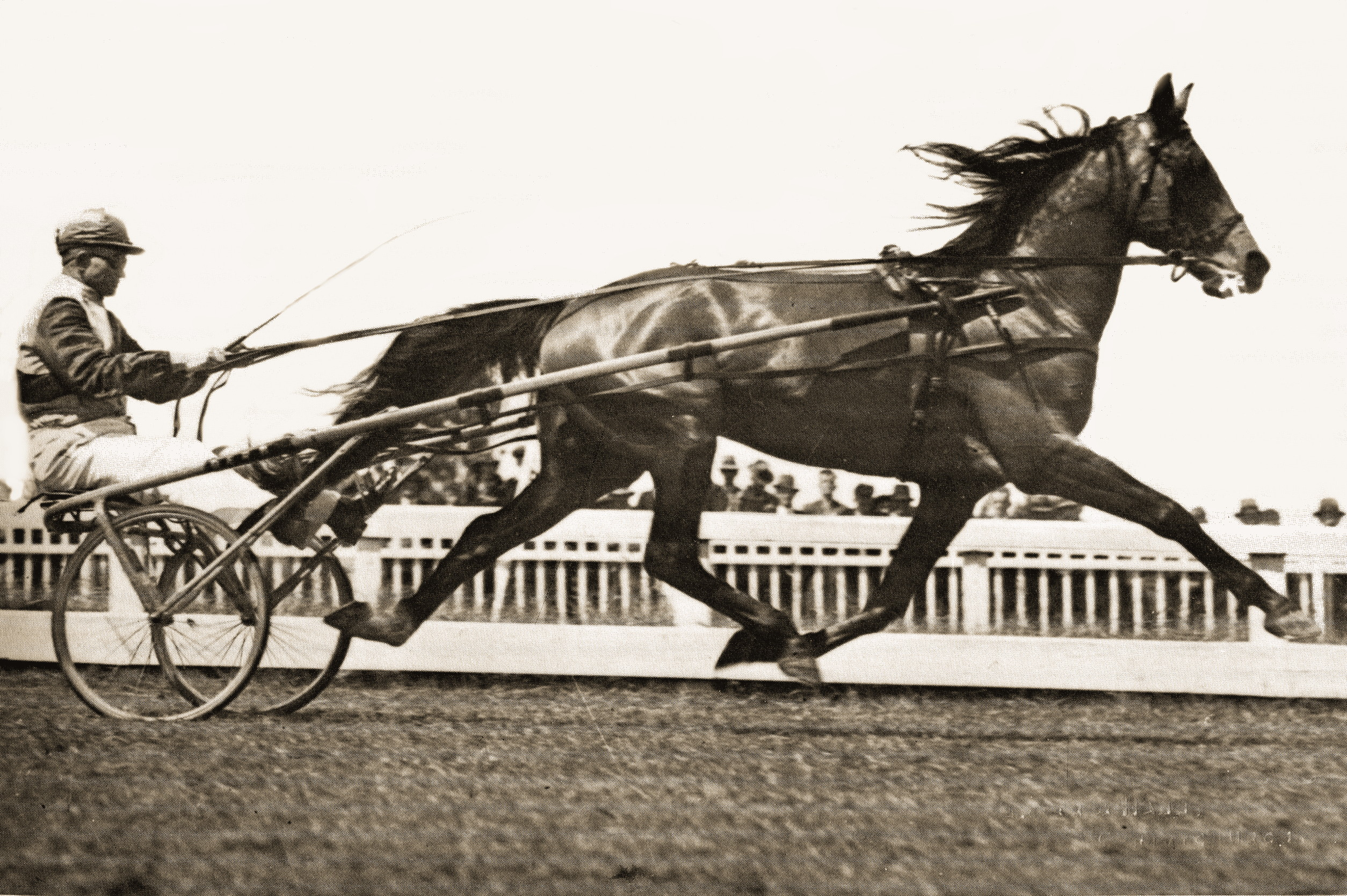
Lawn Derby, pacing un-hoppled.

Trotting races were held as part of the programme of some of the galloping meetings in the Otago Southland area as early as 1864. The first totalisators were introduced about this time. They faced opposition from a curious alliance of bookmakers and anti-gambling factions but were approved by the Clubs and licensed by the Colonial Secretary. The first trotting race on a racecourse in Canterbury, in 1875, before the totalisator was introduced, the stake was only about a "tenner" (£10), but the match created a lot of interest. About 1880, Lower Heathcote Racing Club was founded, supporting gallops, but added trotting events to its programme, giving smaller stakes. Some years later the club discontinued gallops and became the Lower Heathcote Trotting Club, which gave stakes ranging from £15 to £35.

The New South Wales bred, Lawn Derby, racing un-hoppled, was the first pacer to break the two-minute barrier in Australia or New Zealand when he recorded 1:59.4 at the Addington track in New Zealand in 1938.

From these early stages, the sport has developed with top races and top horses from then right up to the present day.

== Racing rules ==
In New Zealand, the metric distances are used. Races are at distances between 1600m and 3200m.

Racing the leader does not have to hand up the lead to any horse that challenges, often leaving a horse parked outside the leader in the "death seat", "the death", or "facing the breeze", which results in this horse covers more ground than the leader.

New Zealand races may have a field of up to 16 horses, although as numbers of horses have reduced some races will have less than 10 starters. This generally means that with the smaller tracks a "three wide train" starts as the field gets the bell to signal their final lap.

There is a system of an 'open lane' or 'passing lane' ('sprint lane' in Australia). These lanes do not operate on all tracks and have been a point of argument between many industry participants.

New Zealand horses are able to easily "cross the Tasman" to Australia, and Australian horses often compete in major New Zealand races.

In 2021, New Zealand aligned the deemed birth date of horses from 1 August to 1 January.

== Major harness races ==
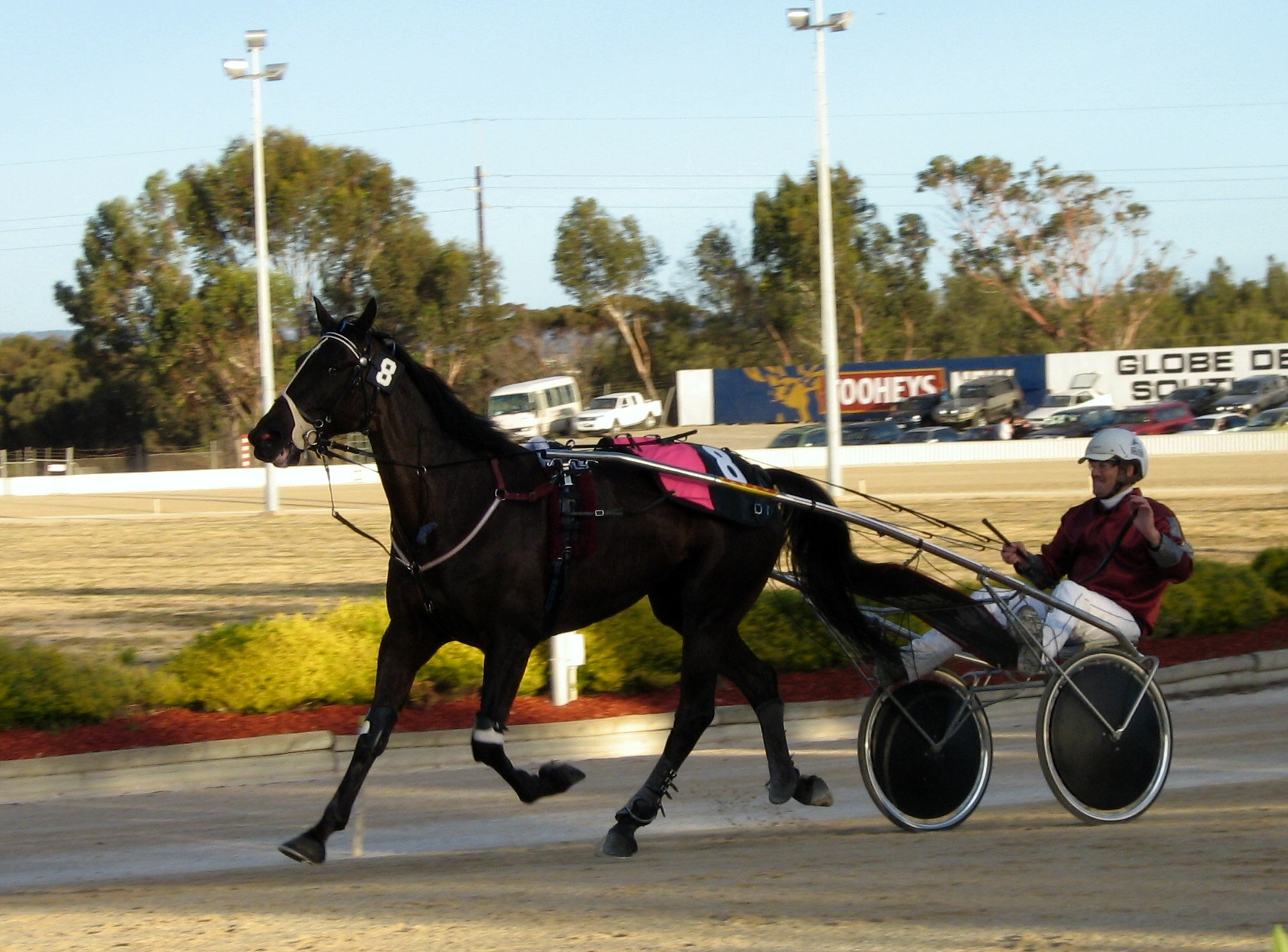
NZ trotter Uncle Petrika

In New Zealand the richest and most important race is the New Zealand Trotting Cup, run for open class pacers in November at Addington Raceway. Other major races include the Auckland Trotting Cup as well as the Noel J Taylor Memorial Mile and the New Zealand Messenger Championship for four-year-olds. There are also the New Zealand Derby and the Great Northern Derby for three-year-olds, and the Dominion Handicap and Rowe Cup for trotters.

A marquee event is the annual series which takes place between New Zealand and Australia called the Inter Dominion. The series, which includes a pacing series and a trotting series, is held yearly. Previously it was rotated around the Australian State Controlling Bodies and once every four years the Inter Dominion Championships were held in New Zealand. However New Zealand has not held the event since 2019.

List of major harness races in New Zealand
Race	Club	Grade	Pace / Trot	Type
New Zealand Sires Stakes	NZ Metro	Group 1	Pace	3YO
Easter Cup (discontinued after 2021)	NZ Metro	Group 1	Pace	Open
The Race by betcha	Cambridge	Listed	Pace	Open
Noel J Taylor Mile	Auckland	Group 1	Pace	Open
New Zealand Messenger	Auckland	Group 1	Pace	Open
Northern Derby	Auckland	Group 1	Pace	3YO
Rowe Cup	Auckland	Group 1	Trot	Open
New Zealand Sires Stakes Fillies Championship	Auckland	Group 1	Pace	3YO Fillies
Hannon Memorial	Oamaru	Group 3	Pace	Open
Canterbury Classic	NZ Metro	Group 2	Pace	Open
Ashburton Flying Stakes	Ashburton	Group 2	Pace	Open
Ashburton Trotters Flying Mile	Ashburton	Group 3	Trot	Open
Kaikoura Cup	Kaikoura	Group 2	Pace	Open
Dominion Handicap	NZ Metro	Group 1	Trot	Open
New Zealand Trotting Cup	NZ Metro	Group 1	Pace	Open
New Zealand Free For All	NZ Metro	Group 1	Pace	Open
New Zealand Trotting Free-For-All	NZ Metro	Group 1	Trot	Open
The Velocity	NZ Metro	Listed	Pace	3YO
New Zealand Derby	NZ Metro	Group 1	Pace	3YO
New Zealand Trotting Derby	NZ Metro	Group 1	Trot	3YO
Invercargill Cup	Invercargill	Group 1	Pace	Open
National Trot	Auckland	Group 1	Trot	Open
Auckland Trotting Cup	Auckland	Group 1	Pace	Open

== Prominent New Zealand pacers ==
The following are some of New Zealand's greatest pacers and races they have won.

Key for 3-year-old and Australian races:

- NZSS – New Zealand Sires Stakes
- GND – Great Northern Derby
- NZD – New Zealand Trotting Derby
- NSWD – New South Wales Derby
- QuD – Queensland Derby
- MM – Miracle Mile Pace
- HC – A G Hunter Cup
- VC – Victoria Cup
- WAPC – Western Australian Pacing Cup

Horse	Born	Sire	Dam	Dam Sire	3YO races	Auck Cup	NZ Cup	NZ FFA	Inter Dom	Major Aust. races	NZ or Australian Horse of the Year	Other notes
Auckland Reactor	2004	Mach Three	Atomic Lass	Soky's Atom	2007 NZSS 1st 2008 NZD 1st	2009 1st		2008 1st 2009 5th	2009 12th 2012 7th	2009 MM 6th 2012 HC 2nd	2008, 2009	
Blossom Lady	1984	Farm Timer (US)	Lumber Lady	Lumber Dream (US)			1992 1st	1992 1st	1992 3rd 1993 3rd	1994 HC 1st 1995 HC 1st	1993	
Caduceus	1950	U Scott (US)	Little Ada	Frank Worthy (US)	1953 NZD 1st	1954 1st	1956 3rd 1958 2nd 1959 3rd	1956 1st 1958 1st 1959 1st	1960 1st			
Captain Sandy	1942	Sandydale (US)	Waikura (US)	Guy Parrish (US)		1948 1st 1949 1st	1949 2nd		1950 1st 1953 1st			
Cardigan Bay	1956	Hal Tryax (US)	Colwyn Bay	Josedale Dictator (US)		1962 1st 1963 1st	1963 1st	1961 1st 1963 1st	1963 1st			The first horse to win $1M. A total of 154 starts for 80 wins and 45 places.
Changeover	2003	In The Pocket	Chaangerr	Vance Hanover (US)	2007 GND 1st 2007 NZD 1st		2007 4th 2008 1st	2008 3rd 2009 3rd				
Chokin	1988	Vance Hanover (US)	Nell's Pride	Tuft (US)	1991 NZSS 1st	1993 1st 1994 1st	1993 1st	1993 1st		1993 MM 1st 1994 MM 1st 1994 VC 1st	1991, 1994	
Christian Cullen	1994	In The Pocket	Pleasant Franco,	Bo Scots Blue Chip	1997 NZSS 1st	1998 1st	1998 1st	1998 1st			1999	
Christopher Vance	1986	Vance Hanover (US)	Disco Girl (NZ)	Berry Hanover (US)	1990 GND 1st	1990 2nd 1991 1st 1992 2nd 1993 3rd 1994 3rd	1991 1st 1992 3rd			1991 MM 1st	1992	
Copy That	2016	American Ideal	Lively Nights	Live Or Die		2020 3rd,	2021 1st 2022 1st					
Courage Under Fire	1995	In The Pocket	Advance Debra	Vance Hanover (US)	1998 NZSS 1st 1998 GND 1st 1999 NZD 1st							
Delightful Lady	1973	Tudor Hanover (US)	Desilu (NZ)	U Scott (USA)		1980 1st 1981 1st	1980 2nd				1981	
Elsu	1999	Falcon Seelster (US)	Interchange (NZ)	New York Motoring (US)	2002 GND 1st 2003 NZD 1st	2003 1st 2004 1st	2003 2nd 2004 2nd	2003 3rd	2005 1st	2005 HC 1st	2004, 2005	
False Step	1952	Fallacy (NZ)	Dainty Direct (NZ)	Dan	1956 NZD 1st		1957 4th 1958 1st, 1959 1st 1960 1st	1960 1st				
Flashing Red	1997	Echelon	Courvy Kazi	Courvosier		2007 1st	2006 1st 2007 1st	2006 2nd 2007 4th			2007	
Great Evander	1952	Bill B Scott (US)	Ayrshire Scott (NZ)	U Scott (US)								
Harold Logan	1922	Logan Pointer (US)	Ivy Cole (NZ)	King Cole (NZ)			1931 1st, 1932 1st, 1934 3rd	1931 1st, 1934 1st, 1936 1st				
Highland Fling	1942	U Scott (US)	Queen Ayesha	Frank Worthy (US)			1947 1st, 1948 1st	1948 1st				
Il Vicolo	1991	Vance Hanover (US)	Burgundy Lass (NZ)	Noodlum (NZ)	1994 NZSS 1st, 1995 GND 1st, 1995 NZD 1st		1995 1st, 1996 1st	1995 1st			1995, 1996	
Im Themightyquinn	2004	Washington V C	Love Sign	Soky's Atom		2011 1st, 2013 1st			2011 1st, 2012 1st, 2013 1st		2011, 2012 and 2013 (Aust)	
Indianapolis	1929	Wrack (US)	Estella Amos (US)	Dale Axworthy	1932 GND 1st	1933 1st	1934 1st, 1935 1st, 1936 1st	1935 1st				
Johnny Globe	1947	Logan Derby	Sandfast	Sandydale (US)	1950 GND 1st, 1950 NZD 1st		1951 2nd, 1953 2nd, 1954 1st	1953 1st, 1954 1st				
Just An Excuse	1998	Live Or Die	My Excuse	Smooth Fella			2003 1st, 2004 1st, 2005 3rd,	2004 1st, 2005 3rd				
Lazarus	2012	Bettor's Delight	Bethany	Christian Cullen	2016 GND 1st, 2016 NZD 1st		2016 1st, 2017 1st	2016 1st	2017 1st	2017 VC 1st 2018 HC 1st	2017 and 2018 NZ, 2018 (Aust)	Raced and won in America
Lord Module	1974	Lordship	Module (NZ)	Bachelor Hanover (USA)			1978 5th, 1979 1st	1978 3rd, 1979 1st, 1980 2nd			1980	
Lordship	1958	Johnny Globe (NZ)	Ladyship (NZ)	U Scott (US)	1961 NZD 1st	1964 1st	1962 1st, 1964 3rd, 1966 1st	1962 1st, 1964 1st, 1967 1st				
Monkey King	2002	Sands A Flyin	Tuapeka Vale	Smooth Fella	2005 GND 1st,	2008 2nd, 2009 2nd, 2010 1st,	2007 2nd, 2009 1st, 2010 1st,	2009 1st, 2010 1st, 2011 5th		2009 MM 1st	2010	
Noodlum	1971	Bachelor Hanover	Deft	Captain Adios	1974 NZD 1st							15 straight wins (28 in career)
Our Sir Vancelot	1990	Vance Hanover (US)	Teeny Teeny (AU)	Overtrick (USA)					1997 1st, 1998 1st, 1999 1st	1997 MM 1st, 1997 WAPC 1st, 1998 WAPC 1st	1997, 1998 and 1999 (Aust)	
Robalan	1967	Lumber Dream (US)	Elsinor (NZ)	U Scott (US)			1972 3rd, 1973 4th, 1974 1st, 1975 3rd	1971 4th, 1972 1st, 1973 1st, 1974 1st			1974	A free-legged pacer.
Robin Dundee	1957	Hal Tryax	Cherry Blossum	Dillon Hall		1965 1st	1963 2nd, 1965 2nd, 1966 2nd	1965 1st	1965 1st=	1967 MM 1st		Dead-heated in Interdom with Jay Ar
Roydon Glen	1980	Smooth Fella	Roydon Dream	Lumber Dream (US)	1984 GND 1st	1985 1st	1985 3rd				1985	
Self Assured	2015	Bettor's Delight	Star Of Venus	Christian Cullen	2019 QuD 1st	2019 1st, 2022 1st	2020 1st, 2021 2nd, 2022 5th	2021 2nd, 2022 1st, 2023 1st				
Smoken Up	2002	Tinted Cloud	Carnlough Bay	Camtastic			2009 3rd, 2010 2nd, 2011 2nd	2010 3rd, 2011 1st		2010 MM 1st, 2011 MM 1st, 2011 VC 1st		
Terror to Love	2007	Western Terror	Love To Live	Live Or Die		2012 2nd, 2013 2nd, 2014 1st	2011 1st, 2012 1st, 2013 1st, 2014 4th	2012 3rd, 2014 4th			2013 & 2014	
Young Quinn	1969	Young Charles (NZ)	Loyal Trick (NZ)	Hal Tryax (US)		1974 1st	1973 3rd, 1974 3rd	1973 4th, 1974 3rd	1975 1st	1975 MM 1st,	1975	

== Prominent New Zealand trotters ==
The following are some of New Zealand's greatest trotters and races they have won:

Horse	Born	Sire	Dam	Dam Sire	NZ Trotting Derby / Stakes	Dominion Handicap	National Trot	Rowe Cup	Inter Dominion Trotting Championship	Notes
David Moss	1983	Gekoj	Proud Countess	Hickory Pride		1993; 1994		1993		31 wins from 89 starts
Easton Light	1964	Great Evander	Beverley Light	Light Brigade		1972; 1974	1973	1976		167 starts, 36 wins and 76 placings
I Can Doosit	2005	Muscles Yankee	Sheezadoosie	Chiola Hanover			2011	2011; 2012	2011; 2012	2012 New Zealand Horse of the Year
Johnny Gee	1961	Johnny Globe	Atone	Light Brigade (USA)	1965	1970				27 wins from 129 starts
Lyell Creek	1993	Royden Glen (NZ)	Kahlum (NZ)	Noodlum		1999; 2001; 2004	1999; 2000	2000; 2001; 2004	2000	Raced and won in America and Europe. 2000 New Zealand Horse of the Year
Nigel Craig	1969	Protector	Pipetre	Hoghland Kilt		1977				26 wins from 80 starts
No Response	1971	Hodgen's Surprise	Cordsworth	Ripcord	-	-	1978	1981	1979	1979 New Zealand Horse of the Year, 24 wins from 60 starts
Petite Evander	1970	Great Evander	Thearle (NZ)	Light Brigade						47 wins (21 in NZ, 26 in America and Europe) from 184 starts worldwide and over $800,000 stakes
Ordeal	1951	Light Brigade (US)	Arizona (NZ)	U Scott (USA)		1960		1961		17 wins from 47 starts
Pride Of Petite	1987	Royal Prestige	Petite Evander	Great Evander					1996; 1997	35 wins from 142 starts
Take A Moment	1995	Armbro Invasion (NZ)	Nakura (NZ)	Jet D'Emeraude		2001; 2002; 2003	2002; 2003	2001	2001; 2003	2003 New Zealand Horse of the Year, 39 wins from 67 starts

== Prominent people ==
The following are some notable people in New Zealand harness racing history:

Person	Achievements & Comments	Other horses associated with
James (“Scotty”) Bryce	Winning driver of 4 NZ Cups (Cathedral Chimes, Ahuriri x2, Red Shadow) & 3 Auckland Cups (Ahuriri, Cathedral Chimes, Man O'War)	Captain Sandy, Great Hope, Sea Born, Shadow Maid
James Bryce Junior	Winning driver of NZ Cup (Great Hope) & 4 Auckland Cups (Captain Sandy x2, Sea Born, Shadow Maid)	Kohara, Red Shadow
Anthony Butt	Winning driver of 3 NZ Cups (Blossom Lady, Flashing Red (x2)), 2 Auckland Cups (Flashing Red & Happy Asset), 1 NZ FFA (Blossom Lady), Inter Dominion Hall of Fame	Lyell Creek, Simon Katz, Stunin Cullen, Take A Moment
Cecil Devine (1915-1990	Winning driver of 6 NZ Cups (Van Dieman, Thunder, False Step x3, Lord Module) & 2 NZ FFAs (False Step, Lord Module). New Zealand Sports Hall of Fame.	Bass Strait
Tony Herlihy	Winning driver of 3 NZ Cups (Luxury Liner, Christopher Vance & Chokin), 8 Auckland Cups (Chokin x2, Christopher Vance, Comedy Lad, Gotta Go Cullen, Luxury Liner x2, Sharp And Telford) & 7 NZ FFAs (Luxury Liner, Tight Connection, Christopher Vance, Chokin, Brabham, Sly Flyin, Gold Ace), Inter Dominion Hall of Fame, New Zealand Order of Merit	
Freeman Holmes (1871-1967 )	Was a champion thoroughbred jockey and standardbred driver and trainer of both codes. Winning jockey of the New Zealand Cup and driver of the New Zealand Trotting Cup (Trix Pointer) & 2 Auckland Cups (Graham Direct, Roi L'Or).	Bonilene, Frank Worthy, Grattan Loyal, Logan Pointer, Stonewall Jackson,
Maurice Holmes (1908–1998)	Winning driver of 3 NZ Cups (Wrackler, Chamfer, Lookaway), 2 Interdominion finals, 2 Auckland Cups (Robin Dundee, Talaro) & 4 NZ FFAs (Harold Logan, Vedette, Lookaway, Robin Dundee). Drove 1666 winners over 49 years. Order of the British Empire. Son of Free Holmes	Noodlum, Pot Luck
Charlie Hunter	Winning driver of Auckland Cup (Young Quinn), trainer of 1975 Inter Dominion champions Young Quinn and Castleton's Pride	
Derek Jones MNZM	Winning trainer of NZ Cup (Hands Down, Blossom Lady). Father of Peter Jones and grandfather of Mark Jones and Anthony, Tim & Rodney Butt.	Rewa Scott, Soangetaha
John Langdon	Winning driver of NZ Cup (Neroship), Auckland Cup (Neroship), Inter Dominion Pacing Championship (Young Quinn) & Inter Dominion Trotting Championship (Castleton's Pride). Inter Dominion Hall of Fame	
Maurice McKendry	Winning driver of Auckland Cup (Sir Lincoln)	
Sir Roy McKenzie (1922-2007 )	Winning owner of 4 Auckland Cups (Garcon Roux, Highland Air, Roydon Glen, Scottish Command)	Game Pride, Sundon
Ricky May	Winning driver of 7 NZ Cups (Inky Lord, Iraklis, Mainland Banner, Monkey King x2, Terror To Love x2), 2 Auckland Cups (Terror To Love x2) & 3 NZ FFAs (Iraklis, Monkey King x2), driver of over 3000 winners.	
Todd Mitchell	Winning driver of 4 NZ Cups (Homin Hosed, Gracious Knight, Just An Excuse x2) & 1 NZ FFA (Just An Excuse)	
Reon Murtha	Long-standing South Island race caller	
D D (Denis) Nyhan	Winning driver of 3 NZ Cups (Lordship x2, Robalan), 1 Auckland Cup (Lordship) & 5 NZ FFAs (Lordship x2, Robalan x3). Son of Don Nyhan, brother of Barry Nyhan.	
D G (Don) Nyhan (1909/10–2009)	Winning driver of NZ Cup (Johnny Globe) & 3 NZ FFAs (Johnny Globe x2, Lordship). Son of Dan Nyhan, father of Denis Nyhan & Barry Nyhan.	
Mark Purdon	Winning driver of 6 NZ Cups (Il Vicolo x2, Adore Me, Lazarus x2, Self Assured), 6 Auckland Cups (Amazing Dream, Auckland Reactor, Dream About Me, Self Assured, Turn It Up, Young Rufus) & 5 NZ FFAs (Il Vicolo, Tax Credit, Young Rufus, Jack Cade, Auckland Reactor, Lazarus). Son of Roy Purdon, brother of Barry Purdon.	Pride Of Petite,
Roy Purdon (1927–2022)	Father of Barry & Mark Purdon. Champion trainer.	Comedy Lad, Framalda, Hi Foyle, Luxury Liner, Melton Monarch, Scottish Charm, Sole Command,
Natalie Rasmussen	Winning driver of 1 NZ Cup (Thefixer), 2 NZ FFAs (Ultimate Machete, Cruz Bromac), 1 Auckland Cup (Vincent), Inter Dominion Pacing Championship (Blacks A Fake x4, Ultimate Sniper)	Chase Auckland, Cruz Bromac, Ultimate Machete
Steven Reid	NZ trainers premiership winner 1997/98, trainer of over 1000 wins	Baileys Dream, Gold Ace, Monkey King
Jack Smolenski (1935–2013)	Winning driver of NZ Cup (Arapaho) & Auckland Cup (Arapaho)	
Doody Townley (1925–1999)	Winning driver of NZ Cup (True Averill), 2 Auckland Cups (Stella Frost & Waitaki Hanover) & 2 NZ FFAs (Stella Frost, Waitaki Hanover).	Bellajily, Hano Direct, Rupee, Stylish Major, Sun Chief, Tactile
Peter Wolfenden (1935–2023)	Winning driver of 4 NZ Cups (Cardigan Bay, Garry Dillon, James, Sole Command), 6 Auckland Cups (Armalight, Cardigan Bay x2, Damian, Enterprise, Sole Command) & 2 NZ FFAs (Cardigan Bay x2).	

== Harness racing clubs and courses of New Zealand ==
Harness racing is held throughout New Zealand, including courses in some of the smaller centres. The following trotting clubs were listed in the 1972 DB Trotting Annual.

Club	Course, Town/city/province	Notes
Northland TC	Kensington Park	
Auckland TC	Alexandra Park, Auckland	1006m right-handed all weather track
Thames TC	Alexandra Park, Auckland	
Franklin TC	Alexandra Park, Auckland	
Waikato TC	Claudelands Raceway	
Bay of Plenty TC	Tauranga	
Cambridge TC	Cambridge Raceway	1000m left-handed all weather track
Te Awamutu TC	Cambridge Raceway	
Morrinsville TC	Cambridge Raceway	
Rotorua TC	Rotorua	
Taranaki TC	New Plymouth	
Stratford TC	Stratford	
Hawera TC	Hāwera	
Wanganui TC	Whanganui	
Manawatu TC	Palmerston North	900m left-handed all weather track
Otaki TC	Otaki Racecourse	1835m left-handed grass track
Masterton TC	Tauherenikau	1800m left-handed grass track
Wellington TC	Hutt Park	The Wellington TC was created in 1916, and racing commenced at Hutt Park. The TC ceased holding race meetings at Hutt Park in 2002
Nelson TC	Richmond Park, Nelson	1432m left handed all weather track
Marlborough TC	Blenheim	
Westport TC	Patterson Park, Westport	1206m left-handed grass track
Reefton TC	Reefton	
Greymouth TC	Greymouth	
Kaikoura TC	Kaikōura	1119m left-handed all weather track
Rangiora TC	Rangiora	1206m left-handed all weather track
Cheviot TC	Rangiora	
Hororata TC	Hororata	
New Zealand Metropolitan TC	Addington Raceway	1193m left handed all weather track. Created by amalgamation of the Canterbury Trotting Club and Lancaster Park Amateur Trotting Club. In 1899 it held its first meetings at Addington. In 1998 it amalgamated with the Canterbury Park TC and New Brighton TC into a "new" New Zealand Metropolitan Club.
Canterbury Park TC	Addington Raceway	In 1922 the Club purchased the lease to Addington Raceway from the NZMTC, which was intending on moving to Riccarton. The NZMTC's move never eventuated so it became a tenant of Canterbury Park TC. In 1998 it amalgamated into "new" New Zealand Metropolitan TC.
New Brighton TC	Addington Raceway	The New Brighton Trotting Club held its first official race meeting on March 16, 1895. In 1963 it moved to Addington Raceway. In 1998 it amalgamated into the "new" New Zealand Metropolitan TC.
Banks Peninsula TC	Motukarara	1811m left-handed grass track
Methven TC	Mt Harding Racecourse, Methven	1386m Left-handed track
Ashburton TC	Ashburton	1497m left-handed all weather
Geraldine TC	Geraldine	
South Canterbury TC	Phar Lap Raceway, Timaru	1830m left-handed grass track
Waimate TC	Waimate	
Oamaru TC	Oamaru	1200m left-handed all weather track
Kurow TC	Oamaru	
Central Otago TC	Omakau	1200m left-handed all weather track
Waikouaiti TC	Waikouaiti	
Roxburgh TC	Roxburgh	1010m left-handed all weather track
Forbury Park TC	Forbury Park, Dunedin	Track closed, held its last meeting on 8 July 2021
Cromwell	Cromwell Racecourse	1627m left-handed grass track
Gore TC	Gore	1000m left-handed all weather track
Winton TC	Central Southland Raceway, Winton	1498m left-handed all weather track
Wairio TC	Winton	
Wyndham TC	Wyndham	
Invercargill TC	Invercargill	1029m left-handed all weather track

The Amberley Racing Club also held trotting races at Amberley Racecourse and eventually an Amberley TC was formed and held trotting meetings. When the Amberley racecourse closed in 1973 the club then held meetings at Rangiora in February and September 1974 and conducted Equalisator meetings at its qualifying trials meetings through until 1980. The Amberley TC held its first full Totalisator meeting on 23 January 1994.

== United States and Canada ==
The association with trotting in New Zealand and the United States has always been strong, with much of the breeding stock coming from America. Particularly in the 1950s and 1960s, New Zealand horses competed in both Canada and the United States. The first New Zealand horse to be raced in America by a New Zealander was the trotter Vodka, the winner of the 1953 Dominion Handicap. He was taken there in 1956 by his owner, J. S. Shaw, won 11 races and was later leased to American interests.

In 1960 Caduceus was the first New Zealand pacer to compete in the Yonkers International Series with his trainer-driver, J. D. Litten. Despite his nine years, Caduceus showed he was the equal of the top American horses, winning the last race of the series, only to be disqualified. He also was leased to American interests and at 10 years of age was still winning races.

False Step was driven in the Yonkers International series during the 1960–61 season by his trainer C C Devine. False Step's performances showed he was one of the greatest pacers in the world. He beat the acknowledged American champion, Adios Butler, in a 1 1/2-mile race. He was sold in America for 115,000 dollars, the fifth-highest price paid for a pacer in the United States.

Arania also entered the series with False Step. She did not do well, but after being leased won several races and proved she was able to race with the best in America, and in fact created a record of 1 min 57 sec for 1 mile in the Lexington Red Mile.

In 1964, Cardigan Bay was to travel to America with reinsman Stanley Dancer, who paid 100,000 dollars for the horse. Cardigan Bay was already an established racehorse in New Zealand, having won the 1963 New Zealand Trotting Cup and other top races in Australia and New Zealand. He went on to win over a million dollars in the United States, the first harness horse ever to do so.

== See also ==
- Harness racing
- Harness racing in Australia
- Horse racing
- Glossary of Australian and New Zealand punting
- Thoroughbred racing in New Zealand
