= Christopher Vance =

New Zealand Standardbred racehorse

- Breed: Standardbred
- Sire: Vance Hanover (US)
- Grandsire: Albatross (US)
- Dam: Disco Girl (NZ)
- Maternal grandsire: Berry Hanover (US)
- Sex: Gelding
- Foaled: 1986-11-05
- Country: New Zealand
- Breeder: R Reid, Estate L F Reid (Waiuku)
- Owner: R R Reid & J C Reid & Lorna Reid Syndicate
- Trainer: Roy & Barry Purdon, Clevedon

Record
- 121 starts: 38 wins 41 placings

Earnings
- NZ$1,747,167

Awards
- New Zealand Horse of the Year

Christopher Vance (5 November 1986 – 13 December 2016) was a Group One-winning New Zealand Standardbred racehorse, trained by Roy and Barry Purdon and generally driven by Barry Purdon or Tony Herlihy.

== Racing career ==
He was the 1991–92 New Zealand Horse of the Year after winning both the major New Zealand races, the New Zealand Cup and Auckland Cup, as well as the Miracle Mile Pace at Harold Park in Australia.

Christopher Vance was not as dominant in the following seasons but remained competitive against top class opposition such as Blossom Lady, Master Musician, Jack Morris and Chokin. In the following year's New Zealand Cup he was 3rd from a 15-metre handicap and breaking at the beginning of the race. In the 1993 Inter Dominion Pacing Championship he won a heat in 1:54.5 for the mile before going on to run 4th in the final.

Notable performances by Christopher Vance include:

Placing	Year	Race	1st	2nd	3rd
1st	1990	Great Northern Derby	Christopher Vance	Mark Hanover	Amos Lee.
2nd	1990	Auckland Cup	The Bru Czar	Christopher Vance	Tight Connection
1st	1991	Noel J Taylor Memorial Mile	Christopher Vance	Mark Hanover	Franco Ice
1st	1991	New Zealand Messenger	Christopher Vance	Franco Ice	Mark Hanover
1st	Nov 1991	New Zealand Trotting Cup	Christopher Vance	Clancy	Surmo Way
1st	Nov 1991	Miracle Mile Pace	Christopher Vance	Defoe	Westburn Grant
1st	Dec 1991	Auckland Cup	Christopher Vance	Starship	The Bru Czar
3rd	Nov 1992	New Zealand Trotting Cup	Blossom Lady	Giovanetto	Christopher Vance
3rd	Nov 1992	New Zealand Free For All	Blossom Lady	Sogo	Christopher Vance
2nd	Nov 1992	Miracle Mile Pace	Franco Tiger	Christopher Vance	Jack Morris
3rd	Dec 1992	M. H. Treuer Memorial	Jack Morris	Band Magic	Christopher Vance
2nd	Dec 1992	Auckland Cup	Master Musician	Christopher Vance	The Bru Czar
2nd	Apr 1993	Inter Dominion Pacing Championship heat	Blossom Lady	Christopher Vance	Westburn Grant
1st	Apr 1993	Inter Dominion Pacing Championship heat	Christopher Vance	Master Musician	Warrior Khan
3rd	Apr 1993	Inter Dominion Pacing Championship heat	Jack Morris	Rustic Lad	Christopher Vance
4th	May 1993	Inter Dominion Pacing Championship final	Jack Morris	Warrior Khan	Blossom Lady
3rd	Dec 1993	Auckland Cup	Chokin	Franco Ice	Christopher Vance
2nd	Feb 1994	A G Hunter Cup	Blossom Lady	Christopher Vance	The Unicorn
1st	March 1994	Inter Dominion Pacing Championship Consolation final	Christopher Vance	Our New Life	Tact Rashad
3rd	Dec 1994	Auckland Cup	Chokin	Franco Ice	Christopher Vance

From April to August 1995 Christopher Vance was driven in a number of Australian races by Brian and Darren Hancock, only managing to win two lesser events. He was then brought back to New Zealand to race but failed to manage a top three placing in his final campaign. His last race was a sixth placing in the Courier Post Flying Mile (Group 2) at Cambridge behind Victor Supreme on 16 February 1996.

During his retirement years, Christopher Vance lived at Cambridge Stud, where he was a companion to the champion thoroughbred Rough Habit. The two were buried next to each other, Christopher Vance dying a month past his 30th birthday.

== See also ==
- Harness racing in New Zealand
