= Lyell Creek =

New Zealand Standardbred racehorse

- Breed: Standardbred
- Sire: Roydon Glen (NZ)
- Grandsire: Smooth Fella
- Dam: Kahlum(NZ)
- Maternal grandsire: Noodlum
- Sex: Gelding
- Foaled: 30 November 1993
- Country: New Zealand
- Colour: Bay
- Breeder: P H Smith (NZ)
- Owner: A M Butt, G A V Bruton (NZ)
- Trainer: T G Butt (NZ)

Record
- 113: 56-15-11

Earnings
- NZ$2,256,924

Major wins
- 1999, 2001, 2004 Dominion Handicap; 1999, 2000 NZ National Trot; 2000 Inter Dominion Trotting Championship; 2000, 2001 Vic Dullard Cup; 2000 Vic Millennium Mile; 2000, 2001, 2004 Rowe Cup; 2001 Vic Bill Collins Trotters Mile; 2004 NZ Trotting FFA

Awards
- 2000, 2001, 2005 Grand Circuit Champion

Honours
- 2000 Harness Horse of the Year (NZ); 2000, 2001 NZ Trotter of the Year; 2000, 2001 Australian Trotter of the Year; New Zealand Trotters Mile Record
- Last updated on: 26 August 2011.

Lyell Creek (foaled 30 November 1993) is one of New Zealand's best Standardbred trotters. Also known as "Creek The Freak", he had 113 starts for 56 wins, 15 seconds and 11 thirds, including an Australasian record 15 Group One wins. His fastest mile rate was 1.52.4 and he won $2,950,224 in stake money, which is an Australasian record for a trotter. Lyell Creek won the 2000 Inter Dominion Trotting Championship Grand Final at Moonee Valley in Melbourne, taking home $295,000 for his efforts. He also won New Zealand's two biggest trotting races, the Dominion Handicap and the Rowe Cup, both on three occasions. In the 1999-00 season Lyell Creek won the Dominion Handicap, Inter Dominion Trotting Championship and Rowe Cup becoming the first horse to win the three races in the same season. At the Inter Dominion carnival in Melbourne he won four Group One races including the Australasian Trotters Championship, Dullard Cup and Millennium Mile where he produced a remarkable winning performance after being trapped wide on the track. It was his sixteenth consecutive win. He won 20 consecutive races until being beaten in the New Zealand Trotting Free For All on Show Day in 2000. The defeat came one start after he had broken the New Zealand record for a trotting mile at Ashburton by winning in 1:55.6. Before racing in the Northern Hemisphere he won his second Rowe Cup and the Bill Collins Mile in Melbourne.

On 1 October 2000 he became the first horse to win consecutive Banks Peninsula Trotting Cups. In the 2000 edition he started off 30 metres but won by 4 1/4 lengths over Jay Bee Ar with the same distance back to One Kenny.

He also raced in Europe and campaigned extensively in North America and raced against some of the best trotters in the world including Sweden's Victory Tilly. Highlights of his North American racing included a win in the Su Mac Lad, a close second in the Titan Cup and a second in the Classic Series Final and in Europe he finished third in the Copenhagen Cup. He started in the Elitloppet in 2001 but did not advance to the final won by Varenne.

A notable achievement of Lyell Creek was that he won 34 of his 37 starts before his extensive Northern Hemisphere campaign, with his only defeats being his debut (over a year before his second start), when pulled-up at his fourth start and when running third in the 2000 NZ Trotting Free-For-All.

After returning to New Zealand Lyell Creek won his third Rowe Cup winning by 7 3/4 lengths. Then aged 11 he won the New Zealand Trotting Free For All at Addington in November 2004 setting a national record for 2600 metres and the Dominion Handicap. He last raced in 2005.

== See also ==
- Harness racing in New Zealand
- Easton Light
- Petite Evander
- Take A Moment
