= Take A Moment =

New Zealand Standardbred racehorse

- Breed: Standardbred
- Sire: Armbro Invasion (NZ)
- Grandsire: Speedy Crown
- Dam: Nakura (NZ)
- Maternal grandsire: Jet D’Emeraude
- Sex: Gelding
- Foaled: 18 December 1995
- Country: New Zealand
- Colour: Bay
- Breeder: A M Corkran (NZ)
- Owner: Long Drive Syndicate (NZ)
- Trainer: T G Butt (NZ)

Record
- 67 starts for 39 wins

Earnings
- $NZ1,164,356

Major wins
- 2001, 2002 & 2003 Dominion Handicap; 2001 & 2003 Inter Dominion Trotting Championship; 2003 Rowe Cup
- Last updated on: 24 October 2011.

Take A Moment (foaled 18 December 1995) is a Standardbred horse and one of New Zealand's greatest ever trotters. Racing from 2000 to 2005, he won 39 of his 67 starts, and his overall prize money of $NZ1,164,356 is only bettered by his stablemate Lyell Creek in terms of Australasian trotters. His biggest wins included two Inter Dominion Trotting Championship Grand Finals, three Dominion Handicaps and a Rowe Cup. He was inducted into the Inter Dominion Hall of Fame.

== Major race wins ==
- 2001 Dominion Handicap (Handicap of 10 metres)
- 2001 Inter Dominion Trotting Championship
- 2002 Dominion Handicap (Handicap of 10 metres)
- 2003 Dominion Handicap (Handicap of 15 metres)
- 2003 Inter Dominion Trotting Championship
- 2003 Rowe Cup

== See also ==
- Harness racing in New Zealand
- Easton Light
- Petite Evander
