= Free Holmes =

New Zealand jockey (1871–1967)

Freeman Wright Holmes
Personal information
- Full name: Freeman Wright Holmes
- Born: 6 June 1871 Ashburton, South Canterbury, New Zealand
- Died: 21 February 1967 (aged 95)
- Occupation: Jockey

Horse racing career
- Sport: Horse racing

Freeman Wright Holmes (6 June 1871–21 February 1967), better known as Free Holmes was an outstanding horse man who was involved with both thoroughbred and standardbred racing. He was born in Ashburton, South Canterbury, New Zealand.

He is notable for being both a champion driver and formerly a champion jockey. He won a unique double of the New Zealand Cup in 1888 for thoroughbreds, at Riccarton, riding Manton, and in 1919 driving Trix Pointer to win the NZ Trotting Cup at the Addington Raceway. As a jockey, he also won the 1894 Grand National Hurdles and 1895 Great Northern Hurdles and Great Northern Steeplechase with Liberator. He was also an expert in the management of thoroughbred horses. He successfully trained and owned horses both over the fences and on the flat.

He was known as "The Grand Old Man of Trotting". and "Old Free" in the trotting fraternity. He also rode and drove trotters. He won two Auckland Trotting Cups.

His son Maurice Holmes was also a driving legend.

== Major wins ==
Standardbreds

- 1936 Inter Dominion Pacing Championship Evicus
- 1935 Auckland Trotting Cup Graham Direct
- 1934 Auckland Trotting Cup Roi L'Or
- 1932 New Zealand Free For All Roi L'Or
- 1922 New Zealand Free For All Trix Pointer
- 1919 New Zealand Trotting Cup Trix Pointer

Thoroughbreds

- 1895 Great Northern Steeplechase Liberator
- 1895 Great Northern Hurdles Liberator
- 1894 Great Northern Hurdles Liberator
- 1888 New Zealand Cup Manton
- 1888 New Zealand Derby Manton

== See also ==
- Harness racing in New Zealand
- Thoroughbred racing in New Zealand
