= John Langdon (harness racing) =

New Zealand harness racer

John William Langdon (24 August 1947 – 15 January 2026) was a New Zealand driver and trainer of Standardbred racehorses. He was associated with many champions and was a leading driver of harness horses in New Zealand.

He was notable for winning the Inter Dominion Championship three times, including twice in 1975 when aged 27. The Inter Dominion is the premier trotting series of races between Australia and New Zealand. He is also an inductee in the Inter Dominion Hall of Fame. Langdon also won the Auckland Trotting Cup and the New Zealand Trotting Cup with Neroship. These are the two top races in New Zealand.

== Big race wins ==
- 1992 Inter Dominion Trotting Championship - William Dee (driver & trainer)
- 1990 New Zealand Trotting Cup - Neroship (driver & trainer)
- 1989 Auckland Trotting Cup - Neroship (driver & trainer)
- 1987 Rowe Cup - Landora's Pride (driver & trainer)
- 1984 Rowe Cup - Jenner (driver)
- 1975 Inter Dominion Trotting Championship - Castleton's Pride (driver)
- 1975 Inter Dominion Pacing Championship - Young Quinn (driver)

== Later life ==
Langdon and his wife Jenny Langdon (née Martin) moved to Queensland in the late 1990s. Langdon retired from the sport in 2001 after injuring his shoulder.

On 15 January 2026, John Langdon died in Australia, aged 78.

== See also ==
- Harness racing in New Zealand
- Inter Dominion Hall of Fame
