= Maurice Holmes (harness racer) =

New Zealand harness racer

Maurice Francis Tancred Holmes OBE (10 November 1908 – 7 July 1998), commonly known as Morrie Holmes, was a driver of standardbred racehorses in New Zealand. He was associated with many champions and was a leading driver of harness horses in New Zealand. His father Free Holmes was also a driving legend.

Owing to his skill, Holmes was known as "the Maestro". He was the most successful reinsman in the history of trotting of New Zealand. He drove 1666 winners and amassed $2,054,555 in stake money over 49 years.

His career lasted from 1925 to 1974. On his last night at the Alexandra Park Raceway, he drove four winners from eight starters. Maurice Holmes still holds the record for the most driving Premiership wins as he won his 18th title in his final year of driving in 1974. He also holds the record for the most wins in the group 1 New Zealand Trotting Derby with 11 outright victories and one dead heat. Holmes also became the first driver to win two Inter Dominion pacing grand finals winning with Pot Luck in 1938 and Vedette in 1951.

In the 1975 New Year Honours, Holmes was appointed an Officer of the Order of the British Empire, for services to New Zealand trotting.

== See also ==
- Harness racing in New Zealand
