= Addington Raceway =

Horse racing venue in Christchurch, New Zealand

Coordinates: 43.5435°S 172.5986°E

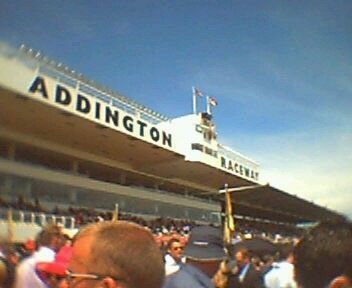
Addington Raceway in 2004

Addington Raceway or The Met is the home of the Metropolitan Trotting Club in Addington, Christchurch in New Zealand. The venue consists of a trotting track, a greyhound track, conference centre and restaurants. It is also home to many feature harness races such as: The New Zealand Trotting Cup and the Dominion Handicap.

The raceway forms part of a sporting complex that includes Rugby League Park and the Christchurch Arena.

== History ==
The NZ Metropolitan Trotting Club (NZMTC) was first based at Lancaster Park in Waltham. Charles Louisson, a steward of NZMTC and Mayor of Christchurch at the time, helped to secure land in Addington and in 1899, the club moved to the present site. From 1906 until his death in 1924, he was the president of the NZMTC. The grounds were enlarged during his presidency. The Louisson Handicap was an annual race that was held for many years. Between 1914 and 1923, Louisson annually donated the silver trophy for the New Zealand Trotting Cup, which he had manufactured in England.

== Inter Dominion ==
Addington has hosted the Inter Dominions in 1938, 1951, 1961, 1971, 1979, 1987, 1995 and 2003. The 2011 series was planned to be at Addington but due to the 2011 Christchurch Earthquake was moved to Alexandra Park.

== Motorcycling ==
Addington Raceway has also hosted the New Zealand Long Track Grand Prix for Motorcycle speedway. It first hosted the GP in 1991 and was won by Kiwi rider Mitch Shirra. It held the event again in 1992 when it was won by German Long Track specialist Gerd Riss (the 1991 Long Track World Champion, Riss would go on to win another 7 Long Track World titles in his career). The last time the track held the event was in 1995 when it was won by another Kiwi, Mark Thorpe.

== See also ==
- Harness racing in New Zealand
- Greyhound racing in New Zealand
- Riccarton Racecourse
- Alexandra Park, Auckland
- Forbury Park Raceway
