= Alexandra Park, Auckland =

Horse racing venue in Auckland, New Zealand

Coordinates: 36.8911°S 174.7781°E

Alexandra Park
- Interactive map of Alexandra Park
- Location: Epsom, Auckland
- Owned by: Auckland Trotting Club
- Date opened: 1890; 136 years ago
- Race type: Harness racing
- Course type: Limestone/crusher dust, right-handed (clockwise); circumference 1010 metres
- Notable races: Auckland Trotting Cup

Alexandra Park is a racecourse in the suburb of Epsom in Auckland, New Zealand. It is the home of the Auckland Trotting Club . The park consists of the Alexandra Park Raceway trotting track, conference centre and a high-end urban village currently under construction. Alexandra Park hosts many feature harness races throughout the year, including the Auckland Trotting Cup and the Rowe Cup, and was formerly the home of the New Zealand Trotting Hall of Fame and museum.

== History ==
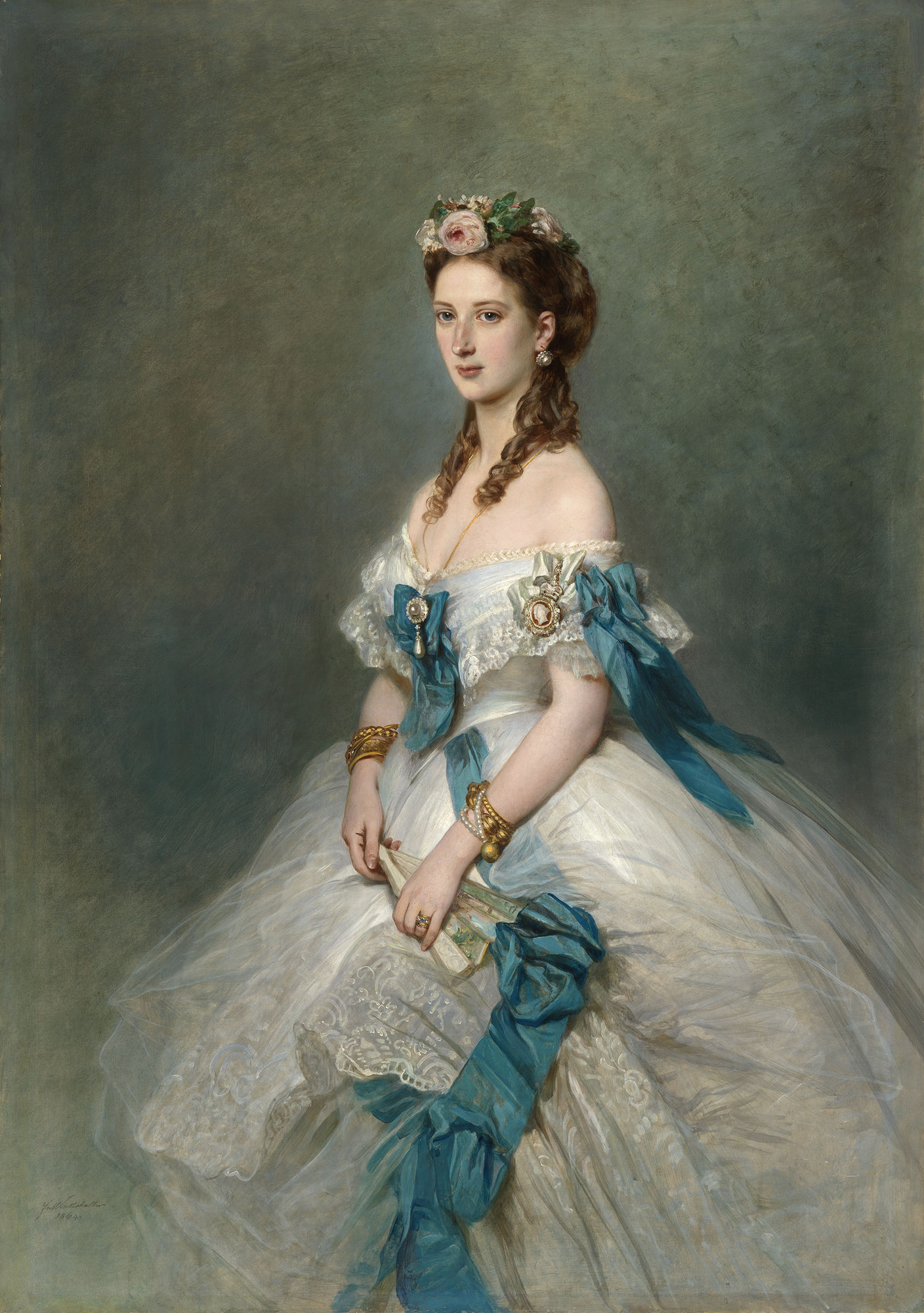
Portrait of Alexandra, Princess of Wales by Franz Xaver Winterhalter, 1864

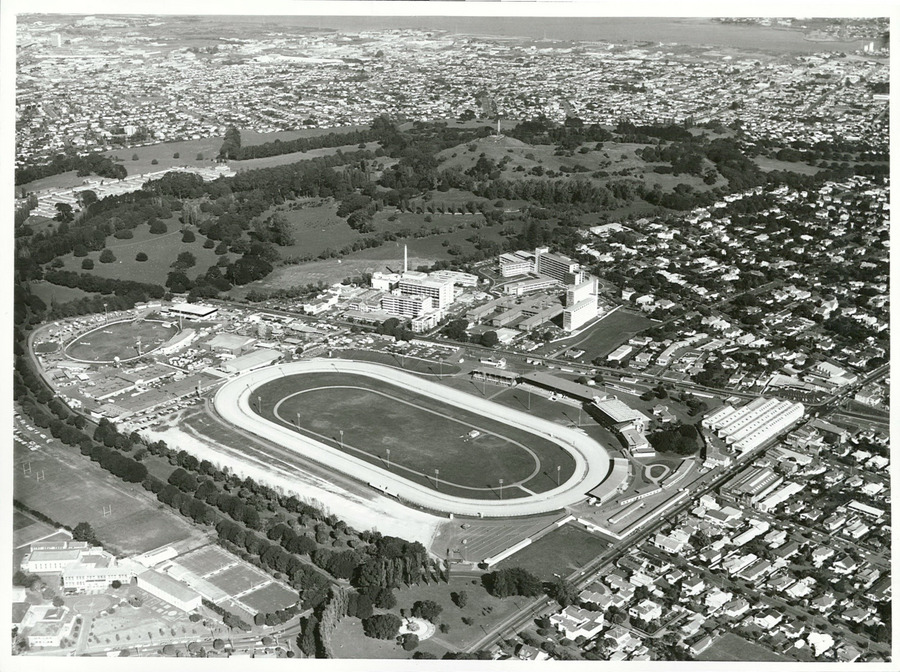
Alexandra and Cornwall Parks, National Women's Hospital and Green Lane Hospital from the air in 1973

Named after Queen Alexandra this is believed to be the site of Auckland's first organised racing in 1842. Part of William Potter's large farm it was known as Potter's Paddock. Bought for their draught horses by the tramways company in 1887 it was, by agreement, still used for football, Rugby and cricket matches. Regular Auckland Trotting Club meetings began in 1890. Ten years later on the visit of her eldest son, the duke of Cornwall, it received the name Alexandra Park and the parkland around it was named Cornwall Park. The first grandstand went up about this time.

Auckland Trotting Club bought the property in 1912 and the facilities have been continuously modernised and provision made for other events and activities. Regular Friday Night Trots (harness racing) under lights have been an Auckland institution since 1958.

In recent years the club's business model has been expanded and successfully overhauled. Under the leadership of former chief executive Dominique Dowding (who resigned in February 2019) and the board of the Auckland Trotting Club, considerable work has been done to ensure Alexandra Park's continued success as well as a long-term financially viable future for harness racing in the northern region. However, the financial success of the club took a severe blow with the problems incurred in the new village development (see Residential development below).

Emphasis has been put on delivering the board's three strategic pillars:
1. To revitalise and reposition harness racing in the region;
2. Grow the business and attract new audiences; and
3. Lift the value of the club's existing property portfolio.

The club's strategic refocusing was recognised at the 2015 Westpac Auckland Business Awards where Alexandra Park took out the supreme title for ‘Excellence in Strategy & Planning’. In 2016 the club was a Central area finalist for ‘Excellence in Marketing’ and ‘Excellence in Customer Service Delivery’.

Recent operational milestones for the club have included merging with the Franklin Trotting Club to provide training facilities in Pukekohe to help reduce the costs for trainers. The board has also announced a number of incentives to lift racing participation at Alexandra Park.

2015 saw the construction and long-term leasing out of a training centre for Super 15 rugby franchise, The Auckland Blues.

Other tenants include Cirque du Soleil; Grand Park Chinese restaurant, Sport Auckland, Lollypops day-care, and Caltex and Burger King on Manukau Road. On course, The Alex Eatery is owned and operated by the club while the park's TAB has the biggest turnover of any in the country, boasting an annual take of over $11m.

On Alexandra Park's conference centre, considerable investment has been made to upgrade the functions facilities with ongoing improvements to in-house catering. Subsequently, utilisation has risen from corporates, large public entities, service clubs and schools. At the same time Alexandra Park is promoting more race-night and hospitality events, with a focus to attract a higher spend audience.

== Residential development ==
In late 2014 a decision was reached by the club's board to construct a significant urban village on part of the club's carpark on Green Lane West, featuring two medium-height residential towers with apartments sitting above retail shops, cafes and restaurants and amongst plenty of public spaces and promenades. With the formal support of Auckland Trotting Club members, the board launched the 223 Green Lane West lifestyle village in early 2015, with construction due to be completed from late 2017 when the first of the 750 residents was supposed to start moving in. The medium-density mixed-use brownfields development is one of Auckland's largest under construction.

However, "ongoing performance issues" with one of the contracting companies, Canam Construction, led to the termination of their contract in July 2018. They were replaced by CMP Construction, whose tower block was meant to be completed by April 2020. As at that date, however, neither that block, nor the other block being constructed by Genellen, had been completed.

In the meantime the Auckland Trotting Club's financial position in relation to the development took a serious downturn because of the problems with the construction and major additional costs incurred, so that an estimated $30 million profit became an estimated $40 million loss. This led to the club calling a special meeting of members in June 2019 to approve the sale of land to cover half of the estimated shortfall. Just two days later it was revealed that large cavities in the lava beneath the site had had to be filled in with concrete and grout before construction commenced. The "many" millions of dollars that this remedial work cost were part of the shortfall.

== See also ==
- Harness racing in New Zealand
- Addington Raceway
- Forbury Park
- Ellerslie Racecourse
