= Centaine (horse) =

Australian-bred Thoroughbred racehorse and champion sire

- Sire: Century (AUS)
- Grandsire: Better Boy (IRE)
- Dam: Rainbeam (AUS)
- Damsire: Vain (AUS)
- Sex: Stallion
- Foaled: 25 September 1980
- Died: 19 April 2004 (aged 23)
- Country: Australia
- Colour: Brown
- Breeder: Mr J R Fleming
- Record: 20:6–4–2
- Earnings: A$120,350

Major wins
- Moonee Valley Vase (1983); Autumn Stakes (MRC) (1984)
- Last updated on September 5, 2026

Centaine (1980–2004) was an Australian thoroughbred racehorse, who became a champion sire in New Zealand. He was a brown horse standing 16.1 hands.

== Breeding ==
Centaine's dam, Rainbeam, won four races in succession including the 1975 Silver Slipper Stakes.

== Racing career ==
Centaine's racing career included wins in the 1983 Moonee Valley Vase and 1984 Autumn Stakes (MRC). He finished 2nd in the Sandown Guineas and Manikato Stakes and 3rd in the Futurity Stakes and George Ryder Stakes.

== Stud career ==
Centaine started his stud career in 1985. He was stood by Garry and Mary Chittick at Thornton Park Stud, Palmerston North and then at Waikato Stud.

He was the champion New Zealand sire of two-year-olds with his first crop in 1988–89 and eleven years later, in 1999–2000. In 1992–93, he won the Dewar Stallion Trophy for the leading New Zealand-based sire by combined Australian & New Zealand earnings.

Centaine had 61 individual stakes winners, including 11 at the group I level. He was the Champion New Zealand Broodmare Sire six times and his daughter produced 121 stakes winners.

In regards the establishment of Waikato Stud and its leading breeding operations, Garry Chittick was reported as saying:

"The turning point was having a horse like Centaine. He was the stallion that really got us going.

Centaine died on 19 April 2004.

=== Notable progeny ===
Progeny of Centaine included the following winners:

- Arletty: winner of the 1998 Villiers Stakes and Queen of the Turf Stakes Stakes
- Centisle: 1994 Tesio Stakes and 1995 The Goodwood
- Century Kid: 2001 Qantas Cup and TJ Smith Stakes, 2002 Premiere Stakes
- Cheiron
- Cordero: 1989 Taranaki 2YO Classic (1200m, Group 3) & Manawatu Sires Produce Stakes
- Critic: 2002 New Zealand Bloodstock Airfreight Stakes (1600m listed 3YOF) & South Island 3YO Championship final (1600m listed), 2003 Duoro Cup (1600m), Otaki-Maori Weight for Age & Rotorua Stakes (listed 1400m)
- Foxwood: 1997 New Zealand 2000 Guineas & 1998 Captain Cook Stakes
- Kapchat
- Kinjite
- La Rumba: 2002 Group 3 Eclipse Stakes
- Perfect World: 1996 City of Sales Trophy (1600m, G2), runner up in 1994 Sandown Guineas & 1995 Hobartville Stakes behind Danewin
- Pernod
- Sequel: 2000 Hardy Boys (1600m Group 2, Flemington), 2002 Tauranga Classic (listed 1400m)
- Sixty Seconds: 2002 Championship Stakes
- Slight Chance
- Spring Rain (1999–2000 Mercedes Champion Two-Year-Old)
- Stella Cadente
- Super Fit (Centalog): 1994 Hong Kong Derby
- Taineberry: 6 wins including the Group 2 Scottsville Oaks and listed Clairwood Easter Handicap (South Africa).
- Taupo Retreat
- Ultimate Aim: 1992 Waikato Gold Cup, 1993 Geelong Cup

=== Broodmare sire ===
Centaine was broodmare sire of the following:

- Alamosa: 2007 Diamond Stakes, Hawke's Bay Guineas, Avondale Guineas 2008 Thorndon Mile, Otaki-Maori Weight for Age and Toorak Handicap
- Bad Boy Brown: 2019 Great Northern Hurdle & Grand National Hurdles
- Cent Home: 1999 Kelt Capital Stakes & Captain Cook Stakes, 2000 Mudgway Stakes, 2001 St George Stakes and 2002 Awapuni Gold Cup
- Dal Cielo: 2015 Diamond Stakes, also runner up in the 2015 Sandown Guineas
- Gagarin: 2015 Hawke's Bay Hurdle & Great Northern Hurdle, 2019 Manawatu Steeplechase & Wellington Steeplechase
- Giovana: 2000 Queensland Oaks, 2001 New Zealand International Stakes, 2002 The Oaks Stud Classic and Thorndon Mile
- Jimmy Choux: 2010 Hawke's Bay Guineas, New Zealand 2000 Guineas and New Zealand Derby, (2011) Rosehill Guineas, Windsor Park Plate and Spring Classic, 2010/11 New Zealand Horse of the Year
- Miss Wilson: 2017 Cuddle Stakes (1600m Group 3) & Spring Sprint (1400m Group 3), 2018 New Zealand Thoroughbred Breeders Stakes
- Mongolian Khan: 2015 Waikato Guineas, Avondale Guineas, New Zealand Derby, Australian Derby and Caulfield Cup
- Star Of Gold: 1999 Lightning Handicap (1000m listed), 2001 Telegraph Handicap

=== Other descendants ===
Centaine continues to be found in the pedigree of many top New Zealand or Australian horses. For example:

- Avantage
- Mo'unga

== Pedigree ==
Pedigree of Centaine
Sire Century dk.b. 1969	Better Boy b. 1951	My Babu	Djebel
Sire Century dk.b. 1969	Better Boy b. 1951	My Babu	Perfume
Sire Century dk.b. 1969	Better Boy b. 1951	Better So	Mieuxce
Sire Century dk.b. 1969	Better Boy b. 1951	Better So	Soga
Sire Century dk.b. 1969	Royal Suite dk.b. 1960	Rego	Nasrullah
Sire Century dk.b. 1969	Royal Suite dk.b. 1960	Rego	Missy Suntan
Sire Century dk.b. 1969	Royal Suite dk.b. 1960	Baraganda	Baroda
Sire Century dk.b. 1969	Royal Suite dk.b. 1960	Baraganda	Propaganda
Dam Rainbeam b. 1973	Vain ch. 1966	Wilkes	Court Martial
Dam Rainbeam b. 1973	Vain ch. 1966	Wilkes	Sans Tare
Dam Rainbeam b. 1973	Vain ch. 1966	Elated	Orgoglio
Dam Rainbeam b. 1973	Vain ch. 1966	Elated	Rarcamba
Dam Rainbeam b. 1973	Rain Shadow blk. 1967	Todman	Star Kingdom
Dam Rainbeam b. 1973	Rain Shadow blk. 1967	Todman	Oceana
Dam Rainbeam b. 1973	Rain Shadow blk. 1967	Rain Mist	Helios
Dam Rainbeam b. 1973	Rain Shadow blk. 1967	Rain Mist	Rainbird

== Centaine Award ==
An indication of his legacy is that Centaine was granted the honour of having the New Zealand Thoroughbred Breeders Association's annual award for the New Zealand-based sire with the highest global progeny earnings named after him.

== See also ==
- Thoroughbred racing in New Zealand
