= Grand National Hurdles (New Zealand) =

- Class: Prestige jumping
- Location: Riccarton Park Racecourse, Christchurch, New Zealand
- Race type: Thoroughbred - Jump Racing

Race information
- Distance: 4200 m
- Surface: Turf
- Track: Left-handed
- Qualification: Open
- Weight: Handicap
- Purse: NZ$100,000 (2026)

The Great National Hurdles held at Riccarton Park Racecourse is one of New Zealand's major steeplechase jumping races.

== History ==
The Grand National Hurdles has been held on 134 occasions to date. It was first run in July 1890 over two miles (3200m), later being extended to two and a half miles in 1916.

Since 1973 it has been run over a distance of 4200m and in winter when the grass tracks are soft or heavy. The race which requires 15 sets of hurdles to be jumped is therefore a test of stamina and fitness for both horse and rider.

Bert Ellis rode five winners (1925, 1927, 1938, 1939 and 1941).

Women jockey winners are Leanne Elliot (1992), Tina Egan (1994), Megan Prendergast (1999), Rochelle Lockett (2002 and 2003), Michelle Hopkins (2004), Hayley Curran (2012), Kayla Veenendaal (2013) and Portia Matthews (2023 and 2024).

== Race results ==
Year	Winner	Sire	Dam	Dam-Sire	Jockey	Trainer(s)	Time	Second	Third
2026	Little Thief 65	Dundeel	Stolen Gem	Snitzel	Lemmy Douglas	Kevin Myers, Whanganui	5:02.69 (heavy)	Quid 65.5	Happy Star 70
2025	Suliman 66	Redwood (GB)	Red Mariete (Aus)	Red Ransom (USA)	Hamish McNeill	Paul Nelson & Corrina McDougall, Hastings	5:20.26 (heavy)	Quid 66	Happy Star 67
2024	Berry The Cash 73	Jakkalberry (Ire)	Likely Story (NZ)	High Yield (USA)	Portia Matthews	Mark Oulaghan, Awapuni	5:16.40 (heavy)	Run Jakko Run 66	Metallo 66
2023	Berry The Cash 66	Jakkalberry (Ire)	Likely Story (NZ)	High Yield (USA)	Portia Matthews	Mark Oulaghan, Awapuni	4:58.89 (heavy)	Happy Star 70	Obrigado 66
2022	Happy Star 67	Fabulous	Carlton Queen	Zed	Shaun Phelan	Kevin Myers, Wanganui	5:14.63 (heavy)	He's Ric 67	Phelyn Foxy 65
2021	The Cossack 70.5	Mastercraftsman (Ire)	Stellardelmar (Aus)	Galileo (Ire)	Shaun Phelan	Paul Nelson & Corrina McDougal, Hastings	4:51.91 (soft)	Dr Hank 65	Aigne 66.5
2019	Bad Boy Brown 65.5	St Reims	Pay 'N' Display	Centaine (Aus)	Isaac Lupton	Harvey Wilson	5:27.73 (heavy)	Laekeeper 68.5	No Tip 67
2018	Jackfrost 65	Gallant Guru (Aus)	Vital Note	Yamanin Vital	Stuart Higgins	Brian & Shane Anderton	4:57.58 (heavy)	Laekeeper 66	Second Innings 65
2017	Ready Eddie 65	Yamanin Vital	Tawnce	Personal Escort (USA)	Hamish McNeill	Laura Knight	5:22.78 (heavy)	Go Go Gonzo 65	Delacroix 65.5
2016	Ngario 65	Captain Rio (GB)	Dame Ngaio	Deputy Governor (USA)	Shaun Fannin	Kevin Myers, Wanganui	4:58.90 (heavy)	Gagarin 67.5	Ready Eddie 65
2015	Tallyho Twinkletoe 65	St Reims	Albacora	Lord Ballina (Aus)	Mathew Gillies	Kevin Myers, Wanganui	4:43.11 (soft)	Kings Deep 68.5	Wee Biskit 69

There was no race in 2020 due to COVID-19 restrictions.

== Prior years ==
Past winners of the Grand National Hurdles include the following.

- 1890 Ixion (T Stewart) - 5yo
- 1891 Couranto (Redmond)
- 1892 Kulnine (W C Clarke) - 5yo
- 1893 Liberator (Powell)
- 1894 Liberator (Free Holmes)
- 1895 Donald McKinnon (Ashdown)
- 1896 Dummy (P Johnson)
- 1897 Umslopagaas (R Kingan)
- 1898 Social Pest (W C Clarke)
- 1899 Defiance (P Williams)
- 1900 Record Reign (W C Clarke)
- 1901 Haydn (W Fahey), also won the 1902 Grand National and 1903 Great Northern Steeplechase
- 1902 Tresham (A Julian) - 5yo
- 1903 Waiwera (A Hall)
- 1904 Medallius (A McConnon)
- 1905 Creusot (F Lind)
- 1906 Cuiragno (W Wilson)
- 1907 Shrapnel (Bill Young, 1st win)
- 1908 Stormont (W Jarvis)
- 1909 Compass (J Delaney)
- 1910 Paisano (Bill Young, 2nd win)
- 1911 Continuance (Bill Young, 3rd win)
- 1912 Waterworks (W Adams)
- 1913 Morning (A Julian) - 5yo
- 1914 Royal Arms (H McSweeney)
- 1915 Hurakia (J O'Connell)
- 1916 Art (D McKay)
- 1917 Sleight Of Hand (A McDonald)
- 1918 Kauri King (F W Ellis)
- 1919 Sir Solo (L Hagerty) - 12yo
- 1920 Hylans (J T Humphries)
- 1921 Gladful (A H Burt), also winner of the 1918 Great Northern Hurdles
- 1922 Gladful (L G Morris) - 12yo
- 1923 General Advance (S Walls)
- 1924 Lochson (J R Kaan)
- 1925 Penury Rose (A E "Bert" Ellis, 1st win)
- 1926 Comical (A H Burt)
- 1927 Whamcliffe (A E "Bert" Ellis, 2nd win)
- 1928 Nukumai (W J Bowden)
- 1929 Mangani (H Dulieu)
- 1930 Carinthia (F Thompson)
- 1931 Callamart (A Jenkins)
- 1932 Membo (G Salt)
- 1933 Hounslow (W J Pascoe)
- 1934 Huntique (R Drinkwater)
- 1935 Jolly Beggar (H Turner, 1st win)
- 1936 Jolly Beggar (R Beale)
- 1937 Cottingham (H Turner, 2nd win)
- 1938 Padishah (A E "Bert" Ellis, 3rd win)
- 1939 Padishah (A E "Bert" Ellis, 4th win), also won the 1939 Grand National Steeplechase
- 1940 Limbohm (W Jenkins)
- 1941 The Dozer (A E "Bert" Ellis, 5th win)
- 1942 Renascor (T Tito)
- 1943 Town Survey (L C Brown), also won the 1943 Great Northern Hurdles
- 1944 Flying Spy (L C Brown) - 1st mare to win the race
- 1945 Arabian Night (R Heasley)
- 1946 Bramble Song (W O Ensor), also won the 1946 Great Northern Hurdles
- 1947 Boolamskee (T J Boyle)
- 1948 Tremello (F C Cleaver)
- 1949 Hunting Mac (K J Thomson), also won the 1947 Great Northern Hurdles
- 1950 Gay Fellow (M B Andrews)
- 1951 All Pockets (A J Murray)
- 1952 Peter Ora (W E Carter)
- 1953 Coppice (Johnny Carter), also won the 1953 Great Northern Hurdles
- 1954 Cogitation (A G Waddell), also won the 1957 Grand National Steeplechase
- 1955 Solar Mist (Johnny Carter), also won the 1954 & 1955 Great Northern Hurdles
- 1956 Brue (V H Simpson)
- 1957 Judge (G Jenkins)
- 1958 Meresun (D M Keenan), also won the 1957 Great Northern Hurdles
- 1959 Armed (Brian "Baggy" Hillis, 1st win)
- 1960 Golden Defaulter (A K Lawrence), also won the 1962 Grand National Steeplechase
- 1961 Blue Rock (C I "Clem" Goss), also won the 1963 Great Northern Steeplechase
- 1962 Vamoose (A Cowan)
- 1963 Cretan (H N Rauhihi)
- 1964 Smoke Ring (Brian "Baggy" Hillis, 2nd win), also won the 1964 & 1965 Great Northern Hurdles
- 1965 Bagush (P R Wilson)
- 1966 Eiffel Tower (W J Hillis)
- 1967 Eiffel Tower (W J Hillis), also won the 1967 Great Northern Steeplechase
- 1968 Lordtuckey (Brian "Baggy" Hillis, 3rd win), also won the 1968 Great Northern Hurdles
- 1969 King Minos (G R Bell)
- 1970 Sabaean Summer (R A Jenkins)
- 1971 Frederik (R S Brown)
- 1972 Never Give In (N Treweek)
- 1973 Yenisei (H Green)
- 1974 Frederik (B I Waerea), also won the 1974 Wellington Steeplechase
- 1975 Detroit (B P Kennedy)
- 1976 Royal Mail (G S McIntosh)
- 1977 Sheikle (S J Allen) - 5yo
- 1978 Rapid Flight (J C Collett)
- 1979 Jack Dugan (A Mavor)
- 1980 Bymai (N J Harnett), also won the 1984 Grand National Steeplechase
- 1981 Dark Purple (Ken Browne)
- 1982 Sebastiano (Stephen Jenkins, 1st win)
- 1983 Jean Rapier (Stephen Jenkins, 2nd win), also won the 1983 Great Northern Hurdles
- 1984 Crown Star (H F Pateman), also won the 1985 & 1986 Grand National Steeplechase
- 1985 Gun For Fun (Stephen Jenkins, 3rd win)
- 1986 Lord Venture (N F Ridley)
- 1987 Stormy Knight (J G McGifford)
- 1988 Ocean Guard (W D Harnett)
- 1989 Ampac (Chris Johnson, 1st win)
- 1990 Mister Divinsky (C E Clifton)
- 1991 Sir Barton (D Dennett)
- 1992 Charlie Boy (Leanne Elliot) - 1st female jockey to win the race
- 1993 Woodbine Blue Chip (Chris Johnson, 2nd win)
- 1994 Raggamuffin Rose (Tina Egan) - 2nd mare & 2nd female jockey to win the race
- 1995 Bart’s Best (Alex "Snooky" Cowan, 1st win)
- 1996 Bart’s Best (Alex "Snooky" Cowan, 2nd win)
- 1997 Mill Road (R Donnelly)
- 1998 Eric The Bee (Alex "Snooky" Cowan, 3rd win)
- 1999 Arch Rival (Megan Prendergast)
- 2000 Rand (E D Lamb)
- 2001 Narousa (S C Anderton)
- 2002 Lucky Tip (Rochelle Lockett, 1st win)
- 2003 Cool Water (Rochelle Lockett, 2nd win)
- 2004 Just A Swagger (Michelle Hopkins)
- 2005 Just A Swagger (Jonathan Riddell)
- 2006 Yourtheman (Tom Hazlett)
- 2007 Counter Punch (Tom Hazlett)
- 2008 Just Not Cricket (Jonathan Riddell)
- 2009 High Season (Brett Scott)
- 2010 Joint Effort (Mathew Cropp)
- 2011 Kid Columbus (Chris Johnson, 3rd win)
- 2012 Wotabuzz (Hayley Curran)
- 2013 Mahanadi (Kayla Veenendaal)
- 2014 Gargamel (Alan Browne)

== See also ==
- Great Northern Hurdles
- Grand National Steeplechase (New Zealand)
- Great Northern Steeplechase
- New Zealand Cup
- Thoroughbred racing in New Zealand
