= Grand National Steeplechase (New Zealand) =

- Class: Prestige jumping
- Location: Riccarton Park Racecourse, Christchurch, New Zealand
- Race type: Thoroughbred - Jump Racing

Race information
- Distance: 5600 m
- Surface: Turf
- Track: Left-handed
- Qualification: Open
- Weight: Handicap
- Purse: NZ$200,000 (2026)

The Great National Steeplechase held at Riccarton Park Racecourse is one of New Zealand's major steeplechase jumping races.

== History ==
The Grand National was first run in 1875 in Willowbridge, near Waimate in South Canterbury, over 4 miles. Since 1891 the horses have competed over a three and a half mile journey (now 5600m), making it one of New Zealand's longest horse races and it is run in winter when the grass tracks are soft or heavy. The race is therefore a great test of stamina and fitness for both horse and rider.

Initially the race was run alternately in South Canterbury, North Otago and North Canterbury. In 1884 Christchurch became the permanent venue and in 1888 it was arranged that the Canterbury Jockey Club should run the Grand National Steeplechase and it has been held at Riccarton ever since.

In May 2025 it was announced that the 2025 Grand National Steeplechase, which was the 150th edition, would be sponsored by the Racecourse Hotel & Motor Lodge which has sat opposite Riccarton Park Racecourse since 1883 and would be raced for stake money of $200,000. Peter Cordner, Chairman of the Trustees of the Christchurch Racecourse said:

“In 1878 the land now commonly known as Riccarton Park Racecourse was vested in the Trustees of the Christchurch Racecourse. It is fitting that our Board supports the celebration of the 150th running of a race that is such an integral part of the fabric of this famous piece of New Zealand land that we administer”.

== Records ==
Jockeys to have won the race four times are:

- Ken Browne in 1978 (Regal Mink), 1981 (Charlestown), 1985 and 1986 (Crown Star).
- Shaun Phelan in 2014, 2017, 2019 and 2021.

Women jockeys to have won the race are:

- 1994 Debbie Henderson
- 1995 Leanne Elliot
- 1999 Megan Prendergast
- 2000 Rochelle Lockett

The most successful horses are the three-time winners:

- Agent (1879, 1880 and 1884)
- West Coast (2022, 2023 and 2024).

== Race results ==
Year	Winner	Sire	Dam	Dam-Sire	Jockey	Trainer(s)	Time	Second	Third
2026	Lord Spencer 65	Zed	La Vilente	Al Akbar (Aus)	Lemmy Douglas	JJ Rayner, Whanganui	7:09.50 (heavy)	Brucie 65	Prince Turbo 65
2025	Captains Run 66	Nom Du Jeu	Irish Penny	Pentire (GB)	Joshua Parker	Dan O'Leary, Marton	7:38.96 (heavy)	Jesko 66	Nedwin 66
2024	West Coast 73	Metre En Jeu (NZ)	Testament (NZ)	Grosvenor (NZ)	Shaun Fannin	Mark Oulaghan, Awapuni	7:10.88 (heavy)	Auld Jock 66	Captains Run 66
2023	West Coast 72	Metre En Jeu (NZ)	Testament (NZ)	Grosvenor (NZ)	Shaun Fannin	Mark Oulaghan, Awapuni	7:10.38 (heavy)	Prince Turbo 66	Carnaby 66
2022	West Coast 65	Metre En Jeu (NZ)	Testament (NZ)	Grosvenor (NZ)	Shaun Fannin	Mark Oulaghan, Awapuni	7:26.21 (heavy)	Carnaby 67.5	Tittletattle 68
2021	Tallyho Twinkletoe 70	St Reims (NZ)	Albacora (NZ)	Lord Ballina (Aus)	Shaun Phelan	Kevin Myers, Wanganui	7.39.32 (heavy)	Mandalay 65	Shamal 68
2019	It's A Wonder 65	Istidaad (USA)	Princess Julie (NZ)	Prince Ferdinand (GB)	Shaun Phelan	Harvey Wilson	7:25.90 (heavy)	Gargarin 68	Mr Enthusiastic 65
2018	Shamal 65	Zabeel (NZ)	Mistrale (NZ)	Volksraad (GB)	Buddy Lammas	Ken Duncan	7:01.05 (heavy)	Tai Ho 65	Chocolate Fish 65
2017	Upper Cut 69	Yamanin Vital (NZ)	Volucidate (NZ)	Volksraad (GB)	Shaun Phelan	Mark Oulaghan, Awapuni	7:22.12 (heavy)	Kina Win 65	Tai Ho 65
2016	Upper Cut 65	Yamanin Vital (NZ)	Volucidate (NZ)	Volksraad (GB)	Paul Hamblin	Mark Oulaghan, Awapuni	7:12.06 (heavy)	Mr Mor 68	Gargamal 65
2015	High Forty 69.5	Danzighill (Aus)	Rubiette (Aus)	Rubiton (Aus)	Michael Mitchell	Brian & Shane Anderton	7:00.60 (heavy)	Mr Mor 70	Hezanakilad 65
2014	Eric The Viking 65	Viking Ruler (Aus)	Shrule Grove (NZ)	Lord Ballina (Aus)	Shaun Phelan	Aaron Bidlake	7:14.52 (heavy)	Athenry 65	Roodyvoo 68.5

There was no race in 2020 due to COVID-19 restrictions.

== Prior years ==
Winning horses and jockeys

- 2013 El Patron (Matthew Cropp)
- 2012 Cape Kinaveral (Cody Singer)
- 2011 Counter Punch (Isaac Lupton)
- 2010 Counter Punch (Isaac Lupton)
- 2009 Bennyosler (Richard Eynon)
- 2008 Just A Swagger (Brett Scott)
- 2007 Gauchito Bastado (Isaac Lupton)
- 2006 Bogeyman (Tom Hazlett)
- 2005 No Hero (Jonathan Riddell)
- 2004 Mr Easystreet (Clayton Chipperfield)
- 2003 Cuchlainn (Finbar Leahy)
- 2002 Eric The Bee (Jonathan Riddell)
- 2001 Bodle (Jonathan Riddell)
- 2000 Currency (Rochelle Lockett)
- 1999 Black Rhythm (Megan Prendergast)
- 1998 Deecee Seven (Alex “Snooky” Cowan)
- 1997 Deecee Seven (Brett Scott)
- 1996 Just Jojo (Chad Northcott)
- 1995 Just Red (Leanne Elliot)
- 1994 Noble Express (Debbie Henderson)
- 1993 Fox Hunt (Wayne Hillis)
- 1992 Lismore Lad (Paul Hillis)
- 1991 Nearco Bay (Neil Ridley)
- 1990 Thorley (Graeme Lord)
- 1989 Boomalong (Stephen Stacey)
- 1988 Lord Venture (Shane Anderton)
- 1987 Region (Eddie Lamb)
- 1986 Crown Star (Ken Browne)
- 1985 Crown Star (Ken Browne), also won the 1984 Grand National Hurdles
- 1984 Bymai (Neil Ridley), also won the 1980 Grand National Hurdles
- 1983 Royal Kassel (Stephen Jenkins)
- 1982 Grey Warbler (Dennis Gray)
- 1981 Charlestown (Ken Browne)
- 1980 Thumbs Orf (Stephen Jenkins)
- 1979 Guess Who (Michael Gillies)
- 1978 Regal Mink (Ken Browne)
- 1977 Chumson (Michael Gillies)
- 1976 Thun (Michael Gillies)
- 1975 Fumbler (B R Tims)
- 1974 Mess Time (Ray Jenkins)
- 1973 Loch Linnhe (Graeme Walters)
- 1972 Enceeoh (Alex “Acka” Cowan)
- 1971 Robert Earl (Graeme Walters)
- 1970 Spray Doone (C R Lewis)
- 1969 Robert Earl (Peter R Wilson)
- 1968 Teak (P R Whiteman)
- 1967 Linred (Neil Treweek)
- 1966 Game Call (Alex “Acka” Cowan)
- 1965 Koral (W J “Bill” Hillis)
- 1964 John O’Groats (W J “Bill” Hillis)
- 1963 No Offence (B J Langford)
- 1962 Golden Defaulter (J H Hely), also won the 1960 Grand National Hurdles
- 1961 Dusky Prince (Brian L “Baggy” Hillis)
- 1960 Dusky Prince (Brian L “Baggy” Hillis)
- 1959 Capet (W J “Bill” Hillis)
- 1958 Spring Fair (A G Walsh)
- 1957 Cogitation (J H Hely), also won the 1954 Grand National Hurdles
- 1956 Wotan's Gold (Ray Jenkins)
- 1955 Treasure Ring (Vern Simpson)
- 1954 Young Prince (J H Hely)
- 1953 Duke Royal (J R Gillies)
- 1952 Fairhome (Gary Jenkins)
- 1951 Bandmaster (K A Nuttall)
- 1950 Dawn March (Merv Andrews)
- 1949 Flying Attack (R D Samson)
- 1948 Brookby Song (J Chaplin)
- 1947 Surpeen (Merv Ritchie)
- 1946 Dumbo (Fred Cleaver)
- 1945 Master Meruit (A Midwood)
- 1944 As Required (J Williamson)
- 1943 Anglo-French (A R “Ray” Beale)
- 1942 Foxiana (D W Redstone)
- 1941 Astral Flame (J L Strathem)
- 1940 Clarion Call (Ashley Jenkins)
- 1939 Padishah (G G Beatson), also won the 1938 and 1939 Grand National Hurdles
- 1938 Clarion Call (Ashley Jenkins)
- 1936 Royal Limond (A R “Ray” Beale)
- 1935 Valpeen (W J Bowden)
- 1934 Valpeen (A J Peart)
- 1933 Thurina (A E “Bert” Ellis)
- 1932 Billy Boy (D J Burgess)
- 1931 Snowfall (A E “Bert” Ellis)
- 1930 Aurora Borealis (Horry Dulieu)
- 1929 Wiltshire (Roy C Syme)
- 1928 Wiltshire (Roy C Syme)
- 1927 Beau Cavalier (Sam Henderson)
- 1926 Peter Maxwell (R W McTavish)
- 1925 Tuki (Harry McSweeney)
- 1924 Sturdee (Ernie Warner)
- 1923 Oakleigh (J Roach)
- 1922 Oakleigh (J Roach)
- 1921 Coalition (Harry McSweeney)
- 1920 Coalition (Harry McSweeney)
- 1919 Lochella (Sam Henderson)
- 1918 St Elmn (R Thompson)
- 1917 Master Strowan (R McSeveny)
- 1916 Waimai (E C Rae)
- 1915 Ngatoa (W Adams)
- 1914 Tim Doolan (A J McFlinn)
- 1913 Bercola (Jerry O’Connell)
- 1912 Captain Jingle (Jerry O’Connell)
- 1911 Paritutu (R Thompson)
- 1910 Te Arai (Bill Young)
- 1909 Nabador (J Hall)
- 1908 Eurus (W O’Connell)
- 1907 Eclair (J Hall)
- 1906 Phaetontis (W Higgins)
- 1905 Inniskillen (F Howard)
- 1904 Slow Tom (J McGregor)
- 1903 Awahuri (J Cameron)
- 1902 Haydn ( S Fergus)
- 1901 Gobo (R Arnott)
- 1900 The Guard (W Naylor)
- 1899 Blackberry (James Redmond)
- 1898 Dummy (Percy Johnson)
- 1897 Levanter (J Rae)
- 1896 Mutiny (G Hope)
- 1895 Mutiny (G Hope)
- 1894 Norton (W C Clarke)
- 1893 Waterbury (G Hope)
- 1892 Ahua (W C Clarke)
- 1891 Freeman (W C Clarke)
- 1890 Daddy Longlegs (Tommy Lyford)
- 1889 Chemist (Ellingham)
- 1888 Mangaohane (Hickey)
- 1887 Faugh-a-Ballagh (Tommy Lyford)
- 1886 Canard (H Lunn)
- 1885 Moody (C Hobbs)
- 1884 Agent (Tommy Lyford)
- 1883 Kosciusko (T Sheehan)
- 1882 Katerfelto (W Clifford)
- 1881 Clarence (F Hedge)
- 1880 Agent (H Lunn)
- 1879 Agent (W Hankins)
- 1878 Mousetrap (P McKoy)
- 1877 Fakir (S Osborne)
- 1876 Royalty (Martelli)
- 1875 Medora (Dan O’Brien)

== See also ==
- Grand National Hurdles (New Zealand)
- Great Northern Steeplechase
- Great Northern Hurdles
- New Zealand Cup
- Thoroughbred racing in New Zealand
