= Autumn Stakes =

The Autumn Stakes is the name of several Thoroughbred horse races.

- Autumn Stakes (Great Britain) at Newmarket Racecourse in Suffolk, England
- Autumn Stakes (Canada) at Woodbine Racetrack in Toronto, Canada
- Autumn Stakes (MRC) at Caulfield Racecourse in Melbourne, Australia
- Autumn Stakes (United States) at Sheepshead Bay Race Track in New York
