= Grosvenor (horse) =

New Zealand-bred thoroughbred racehorse and stud stallion

- Sire: Sir Tristram
- Grandsire: Sir Ivor
- Dam: My Tricia (NZ)
- Damsire: Hermes (GB)
- Sex: Stallion
- Foaled: 22 September 1979
- Country: NZ
- Colour: Bay
- Trainer: Geoff Murphy (Victoria)

Grosvenor (foaled 1979) was a New Zealand Thoroughbred racehorse, notable for being the winner of a number of Group One races before going on to forge a successful career as a stud stallion.

He was bred by Pat Kelly with Justine Hogan of Cambridge Stud.

== Racing career ==
Grosvenor's notable wins and placings included:

- 1st G1 1982 Caulfield Guineas (1600m) beating Cossack Prince and Veloso
- 1st G1 1982 Sires' Produce Stakes (VRC) (1400m) beating Cossack Prince and Sir Trout
- 1st G1 1982 Victoria Derby (2500m) beating Cossack Prince and Veloso
- 1st G3 1982 Pago Pago Stakes (1200m) beating Fairy God and High Reserve
- 2nd G1 1982 Spring Champion Stakes (2000m) behind Veloso, with Cossack Prince 3rd.

Grosvenor was rated third below Rancher and Marscay on the Australian Two-Year-Old Free Handicap. He was retired from racing during his 3 year old season due to a persistent fetlock injury.

== Stud career ==
Grosvenor initially stood at Fieldhouse Stud at Matamata, New Zealand before moving to Fayette Park with its proprietor David Benjamin and Masey Benjamin.

He was immediately successful at stud and was the leading first season sire at the 1986 NZ National Yearling Sales and New Zealand First Season Sire in 1986-87.

Grosvenor was put down on 26 June 2001 after he developed severe osteomalitis.

The Grosvenor Award for Champion New Zealand-based sires by total progeny earnings within New Zealand was named in his honour.

=== Notable progeny ===
c = colt, f = filly/mare, g = gelding

Foaled	Name	Sex	Dam	Damsire	Major wins / placings
1992	Alacrity	f	Daybreak Express (Aus)	Duke Ellington (Ire)	1st 1996 New Zealand Oaks, NZ Filly of the Year
1986	Domino	f	Tupelo Honey	Vice Regal (NZ)	1st 1990 New Zealand Oaks, 1st 1990 AJC Oaks
1993	Ebony Grosve	c	Dusky Rosa (Aus)	Indian Conquest (Ire)	1st 1997 Australian Derby, 1st Mackinnon Stakes
1993	Emerald	f	Jennifer Rush (NZ)	Prince Echo (Ire)	1st 1996 New Zealand 1000 Guineas, 1998 Manawatu Cup & 1999 Awapuni Gold Cup. Also 2nd in 1999 Wellington Cup
1991	Look Who's Talking	g	Glenreign	Sovereign Edition	1st 1994 New Zealand Derby
1984	Omnicorp	c	Bourbon Lassie	Mellay (GB)	1st 1987 Victoria Derby
1988	Richfield Lady (Richfield Lass)	f	Sea Princess	Beaufort Sea (USA)	1st 1991 VRC Oaks, 1st 1991 The Thousand Guineas
1998	The Mighty Lions	f	Maybe Yes (Aus)	Last Tycoon (Ire)	1st 2004 Avondale Cup
1984	Westminster	c	Apple Blossom	Bismark II (GB)	1st 1989 Manikato Stakes, 1st 1989 Feehan Stakes, 1st 1990 Otaki-Maori Weight for Age

=== Dam-sire ===
Grosvenor is the dam-sire of:

- 3 New Zealand Cup winners in Pentathon (2006), My Scotsgrey (2009) and Mungo Jerry (2014).
- West Coast, winner of the Great Northern Steeplechase (2023 and 2024) and the Grand National Steeplechase (New Zealand) (2022, 2023 and 2024).

=== Descendents ===
Grosvenor can also be found in the pedigree of the following:

- Ka Ying Rising
- Shamexpress

== See also ==
- Thoroughbred racing in New Zealand
- Thoroughbred racing in Australia
