= Look Who's Talking (horse) =

New Zealand-bred Thoroughbred racehorse

- Sire: Grosvenor
- Grandsire: Sir Tristram
- Dam: Glenreign
- Damsire: Sovereign Edition
- Sex: Gelding
- Foaled: 26 September 1991
- Country: New Zealand
- Colour: Grey
- Breeder: Est late G Setchell
- Owner: Unifaith (NZ) Ltd.
- Trainer: Nigel Tiley
- Record: 21:2-1-1
- Earnings: $151,956

Major wins
- New Zealand Derby (1994)
- Last updated on July 3, 2007

Look Who's Talking (foaled 26 September 1991) is a thoroughbred racehorse who surprisingly won the 1994 New Zealand Derby with a strong finish to beat the well performed Avedon.

The son of Grosvenor only won two races in his career, a maiden race and the Group 1 New Zealand Derby. He ended his career with a record of 2 wins, 1 second and 1 third from 21 races.

Look Who's Talking was trained by Nigel Tiley, and ridden to Derby victory by Grant Cooksley.

== See also ==
- Thoroughbred racing in New Zealand
