= Chris Johnson (jockey) =

New Zealand jockey

Personal information
- Full name: Christopher William Johnson
- Born: New Zealand
- Occupation: Jockey

Horse racing career
- Sport: Horse racing

Significant horses
- Canterbury Belle, Final Touch, Loader, Savvy Coup, Tartan Tights, Tycoon Lil

Chris Johnson, also known as "CWJ" or "The Magic Man", is a jockey in Thoroughbred racing in New Zealand. He is most notable for holding the national record for winning rides in New Zealand (2,515) and for winning the New Zealand jockeys premiership twice.

== Riding career ==
Chris Johnson was apprenticed to Woodville trainer Scott Hammersley. His first winner, Noble Star trained by Hammersley, was in his first raceday ride at Tauherenikau on New Year's Day 1981.

Johnson won the New Zealand Premierships in the 1995–96 season with 139 wins and the 2017–18 season with 112 wins.

He has also won several jumping features, including the Grand National Hurdles over 4200m at Riccarton Park Racecourse aboard Ampac in 1989, Woodbine Blue Chip in 1993 and Kid Colombus in 2011.

In total he has won 21 Group 1 races, including:

- the New Zealand Oaks five times, on Domino, Tartan Tights, Sawadtee, Tycoon Lil and Savvy Coup.
- the New Zealand 1000 Guineas four times with Canterbury Belle, Phillipa Rush, Tartan Tights and Tycoon Lil.

He rode Samasaan to the New Zealand Cup and Wellington Cup double. However, his most successful association with a horse was probably with the John and Karen Parsons trained mare, Final Touch, who he rode to wins in the 2013 Telegraph Handicap, 2013 Waikato Sprint and 2012 Captain Cook Stakes.

His 2000th winner came at Waipukurau in 2014 and at that time he was the sixth New Zealand jockey to reach the mark after Bill Skelton, David Peake, Lance O'Sullivan, Noel Harris and David Walsh. On Saturday 19 December 2020 Johnson established a national record for race victories in New Zealand of 2452, when he road Sassenach to win at Awapuni Racecourse surpassing the previous mark set by David Walsh. Johnson's record haul of wins is all the more remarkable given he gave away race riding in 1998 and did not return until seven years later in 2005.

On 10 February 2022, at Invercargill, Johnson rode Lincoln Hills to his 2,500th New Zealand race victory. His 2,515 New Zealand wins includes 138 Group and listed races.

== Notable victories ==
The following are some of the major races Chris has won.

Year	Race	Horse	Trainer(s)
1984	New Zealand 1000 Guineas	Canterbury Belle	David Kerr
1985	New Zealand Cup	Samasaan	Garth Jackson
1985	Timaru Cup (G3)	In The Glen	Garth Jackson
1986	Wellington Cup	Samasaan	Garth Jackson
1988	Auckland Cup	Sea Swift	Peter & Dawn Williams
1989	Grand National Hurdles	Ampac	DJ (Ned) Thistoll & Gail Whitnall
1989	New Zealand 1000 Guineas	Phillipa Rush	Jim Campin
1990	New Zealand Oaks	Domino	Jim Campin
1991	Wellington Hurdles	Decoy Lad	Neil Coulbeck
1992	Thorndon Mile	Just Tommy	Michael Pitman
1992	Captain Cook Stakes	Rough Habit	John Wheeler
1992	New Zealand Cup	Mercator	Royce & Linda Dowling
1993	Grand National Hurdles	Woodbine Blue Chip	Neil Coulbeck
1993	New Zealand 2000 Guineas	Facing the Music	Mike Ingram
1994	New Zealand Cup	Double Take	Royce & Linda Dowling
1994	New Zealand 1000 Guineas	Tartan Tights	Ellis Winsloe
1995	New Zealand Oaks	Tartan Tights	Ellis Winsloe
1996	Railway Stakes	Loader	Peter & Dawn Williams
1996	Telegraph Handicap	Loader	Peter & Dawn Williams
1997	Waikato Sprint	Avedon	Patrick Campbell
1997	New Zealand Oaks	Sawatdtee	Alan Howatson
1997	Great Northern Hurdles	Clem	Mrs S A Douglas
1997	New Zealand 1000 Guineas	Tycoon Lil	Colin Jillings & Richard Yuill
1998	New Zealand Oaks	Tycoon Lil	Colin Jillings
2011	Grand National Hurdles	Kid Columbus	Murray Hamilton
2012	Captain Cook Stakes	Final Touch	John and Karen Parsons
2013	Telegraph Handicap	Final Touch	John and Karen Parsons
2013	Waikato Sprint	Final Touch	John and Karen Parsons
2018	New Zealand Oaks	Savvy Coup	Michael & Matthew Pitman
2018	Livamol Classic	Savvy Coup	Michael & Matthew Pitman

== See also ==
- Lisa Allpress
- Opie Bosson
- Noel Harris
- Lance O'Sullivan
- Michael Walker
- David Walsh
- Thoroughbred racing in New Zealand
