= Harvey Wilson =

New Zealand equestrian

Personal information
- Nationality: New Zealand
- Born: 9 December 1949 (age 76) Whanganui, New Zealand

Sport
- Sport: Equestrian

Harvey Wilson (born 9 December 1949) is a New Zealand equestrian. He competed at the 1988 Summer Olympics and the 1992 Summer Olympics.

Wilson and his wife Anne have also trained thoroughbred race horses from his Waverley base since 2004. As at 1 June 2024 he has achieved 63 race wins. His victories include:

- Bad Boy Brown - the 2019 Great Northern Hurdles and Grand National Hurdles (New Zealand)
- Barcelona - the 2005 Tauranga Classic
- Dr Hank - the 2022 Waikato Hurdle
- It's A Wonder - the 2019 Grand National Steeplechase (New Zealand) and 2020 Waikato Steeplechase
