= Great New Zealand Hurdle =

Great New Zealand Hurdle formerly the Great Northern Hurdles
- Class: Prestige jumping
- Location: Te Aroha formerly Ellerslie Racecourse
- Race type: Thoroughbred - Jump Racing

Race information
- Distance: 4200m
- Surface: Turf
- Track: Right-handed
- Qualification: Open
- Weight: Handicap
- Purse: NZ$150,000 (2025)

The Great New Zealand Hurdle formerly known as the Great Northern Hurdles is one of New Zealand's feature jumping races.

== History ==
In June 1971 Brian (Baggy) Hillis rode Brockton to win both the Great Northern Hurdles and the Great Northern Steeplechase.

In June 2001 Smart Hunter, trained by Anne Browne, won the Great Northern Hurdles on the Saturday and on the Monday dead-heated the Great Northern Steeplechase with the Kevin O'Connor trained Sir Avion, who was ridden by Wayne Hillis, the son of Brian Hillis. Smart Hunter's rider, Michelle Hopkins became the first woman to win the Great Northern Hurdles and the jumps double.

From 2002 until 2024 the Great Northern Hurdles was raced on the same day as the Great Northern Steeplechase. In 2005 both races were moved from June to September.

For most of its life the race was run over 4190m at Ellerslie Racecourse in Auckland. However, the race was moved to Te Aroha in:

- 2018, raced over 4200m, due to a track upgrade at Ellerslie
- 2021, raced over 4200m on October 3, due to COVID-19 restrictions.

The 2020 race was held on October 17.

The race is no longer held at Ellerslie after the Auckland Racing Club sold land for housing development. From 2022 to 2024 the race was held at Te Rapa over 4200m.

In 2025 a "Great Northern" carnival was scheduled with the Hurdles and Steeplechase to be raced at Te Aroha on separate days again, in September.

In July 2025 the Great Northern Hurdles and Great Northern Steeplechase were renamed as the Great New Zealand Hurdle and Great New Zealand Steeplechase respectively.

Paul Nelson has won the three race times as a sole trainer and four times in partnership with Corrina McDougal:

- Chibuli (2002)
- Just Not Cricket (2006 and 2007)
- The Cossack (2020 and 2021)
- Nedwin (2023)
- Taika (2025).

No other trainer has won the race more than four times.

== Race results ==
Year	Winner	Jockey	Trainer(s)	Sire	Dam	Damsire	Time	Second	Third
2026 (Te Aroha)	Quid 67	Kylan Wiles	Kevin Myers	Rios	Shilling	Rainbow Myth	4:54.81 (heavy)	Squire 69	Jake 65
2025 (Te Aroha)	Taika 66	Mathew Gillies	Paul Nelson & Corrina McDougal	Mettre En Jeu (NZ)	Isabella Soraya (NZ)	Al Akbar (Aus)	5:07.70 (4200m)	The Bambino 66	Lord Spencer 66
2024 (Te Rapa)	Lord Spencer 66	Lemmy Douglas (A)	J J Rayner, Wanganui	Zed	La Vilente (NZ)	Al Akbar (Aus)	5:03.92	Mount Ventoux 66	Taika 66
2023 (Te Rapa)	Nedwin 71.5	Aaron Kuru	Paul Nelson & Corrina McDougal	Niagara	Edwina	Don Eduardo	4:53.21	Tahuroa Height 66	Ima Wonder 66
2022 (Te Rapa)	Abu Dhabi 65	Hamish McNeill	Shaun & Emma Clotworthy	Haradasun (Aus)	Tunzi	McGinty	5:08.67	Kajino 68.5	Banks Road 65
2021 (Te Aroha)	The Cossack 70.5	Shaun Phelan	Paul Nelson & Corrina McDougal	Mastercraftsman (Ire)	Stellardelmar	Galileo (Ire)	4:51.91	Dr Hank 65	Aigne 66.5
2020 (Ellerslie)	The Cossack 65	Aaron Kuru	Paul Nelson & Corrina McDougal	Mastercraftsman (Ire)	Stellardelmar	Galileo (Ire)	5:11.09	Lake Superior 65	Aigne 69
2019 (Ellerslie)	Bad Boy Brown 65.5	Isaac Lupton	Harvey Wilson	St Reims	Pay 'N' Display	Centaine (Aus)	5:27.73	Laekeeper 68.5	No Tip 67
2018 (Te Aroha)	Jackfrost 67.5	Buddy Lammas	Brian & Shane Anderton	Gallant Guru (Aus)	Vital Note	Yamanin Vital	5:05.53	Second Innings 65	Laekeeper 66
2017 (Ellerslie)	Zedeedudadeeko 65.5	Charlie Stubbs	James Phillips	Zed	Cheeko Beeko	Straussbrook (Aus)	6:12.45	Storming Norman 65	Kipkeino 67
2016	D'Llaro 65	Brad McLean	Graeme Lord	D'Cash (Aus)	Random Quest	Random Chance	4:45.44	Raisafuasho 65	Ngatiro Gold 65
2015	Gagarin 66.5	Mathew Gillies	Kevin Myers	Pentire (GB)	Flying Chance	Centaine (Aus)	5:43.59	Mahanadi 65.5	Wee Biskit 68.5
2014	Wee Biskit 65	Isaac Lupton	Ken Duncan	Zed	Nancy Hope	Lord Ballina (Aus)	5:35.38	Gagarin 65	Real Treasure 65.5
2013	Harvest The Gold 68.5	Kayla Veenendaal	Mark Oulaghan	Start South (USA)	Ballinda	Lord Ballina (Aus)	4:52.18	King's Deep 66.5	Arose 66
2012	Waitoki Ahi 65.5	Shelley Houston	Kevin Cullen	Generous (Ire)	My Fair Star	Waikiki Star (USA)	4:59.36	Southern Countess 69.5	Waitaha Toa 67.5
2011	Southern Countess 65	Mathew Gillies	Peter Brosnan	Stark South (USA)	Marji's Countess	Peymour (Fra)	5:14.68	Seeking The Silver 64	Solid Steal 66
2010	Mount Sinai 63	Shelley Houston	Ann Browne	Kilimanjaro (GB)	Kessem's Jewel	Kessem	5:22.61	Solid Steal	Southern Countess
2009	Kidunot 64.5	Daniel Bothamley	Ellis Winsloe	Gaius (Ire)	Red Alarm	Alarm Call (GB)	4:47.86	Ho Down 63	Western Line 63
2008	Montezuma 63	Tom Hazlett	Peter & Casey Lock	Generous (Ire)	Classic Shot	Zabeel	5:08.41	The Shoe 63	Mario 64.5
2007	Just Not Cricket 66	Jonathan Riddell	Paul Nelson	Corrupt (USA)	Koru	Diplomatic Agent (USA)	5:02.50	Pasco 63	Counter Punch 66
2006	Just Not Cricket 63.5	Jonathan Riddell	Paul Nelson	Corrupt (USA)	Koru	Diplomatic Agent (USA)	5:03.26	Yourtheman 63.5	Poacher 63

== Previous results ==
The following are previous winning horses, weight carried and jockeys.

- 2005 Starbo 64 (Laura Noel)
- 2004 Cuchulainn 62 (Finbarr Leahy)
- 2003 Narousa 63.5 (Tom Hazlett)
- 2002 Chibuli 61 (Jonathon Riddell)
- 2001 Smart Hunter 62 (Michelle Strawbridge)
- 2000 Gold Story 60 (Finbarr Leahy)
- 1999 Adipose David 60 (Joe Douglas)
- 1998 Sir Avion 61 (Ross Elliot)
- 1997 Clem (Chris Johnson)
- 1996 Salezaar 60.5 (Chad Northcott)
- 1995 Lord Zirito (Peter Tims)
- 1994 Tawhiti Road 63.5 (Brett Scott)
- 1991 After Noon 60 (Stephen Stacey)
- 1990 Star Count 61 (Wayne Thomas)
- 1987 Vincere 65 (Graeme Lord)
- 1986 Sutters Gold 61.5 (Paul Hillis)
- 1985 Gogong 61 (Paul Hillis)
- 1984 Outright 60 (Stephen Jenkins)
- 1983 Jean Rapier 57.5 (Laurie Cavanagh), also won the 1983 Grand National Hurdles
- 1982 Mr Hickey 67.5 (Stephen Jenkins)
- 1981 Mark's Gold 60.5 (T R Gillies)
- 1980 Mr Hickey 62.5 (R L Rokeia)
- 1979 Odland 58 (R A Johnson)
- 1978 Leyland 61 (L B Cavanagh)
- 1977 Owhata Chief 67 (A T Hounsell)
- 1976 Thun 63.5 (M J Gillies)
- 1975 Execute 68 (T Fallon)
- 1974 Cobland 60 (G A Walters)
- 1973 Beau Rouge 9st3 (G R Bell)
- 1972 Transall 9st3 (R J Fergus)
- 1971 Brockton 9st1 (Brian "Baggy" Hillis)
- 1970 Matanuku Blue 9st (H Green)
- 1969 Foxonewa 10st4 (K A Old)
- 1968 Lordtuckey 9st7 (Brian "Baggy" Hillis), also won the 1968 Grand National Hurdles
- 1967 Beyond 9st4 (G Jenkins)
- 1966 Macdonald 9st4 (G A Walters)
- 1965 Smoke Ring 11st5 (R J Leggett)
- 1964 Smoke Ring 9st4 (Brian "Baggy" Hillis), also won the 1964 Grand National Hurdles
- 1963 Elrey 9st8 (J R Potter)
- 1962 Elrey 9st1 (C R Cooksley)
- 1961 Lord Oman 9st (G O Mudgway)
- 1960 Fend 9st7 (J R Potter)
- 1959 Nupla 9st10 (J H Hely)
- 1958 Lochgair 9st13 (R J Turnwald)
- 1957 Meresun 9st (R D Samson), also won the 1958 Grand National Hurdles
- 1956 Hit Parade 9st9 (T Reynolds)
- 1955 Solar Mist 10st13 (J P Carter)
- 1954 Solar Mist 9st11 (J P Carter), also won the 1955 Grand National Hurdles
- 1953 Coppice 9st13 (J P Carter), also won the 1953 Grand National Hurdles
- 1952 Royalcille 9st (W K Caddy)
- 1951 Cornishman 10st3 (W Reid)
- 1950 Paul 9st6 (D Mackinnon)
- 1949 Kauri Pine 10st8 (W D Ensor)
- 1948 South Riding 9st1 (R Gibbs)
- 1947 Hunting Mac 10st1 (D Mackinnon), also won the 1949 Grand National Hurdles
- 1946 Bramble Song 9st4 (J W Winder), also won the 1946 Grand National Hurdles
- 1945 Good Armour 9st (F J Hain)
- 1944 Hunto 10st10 (J W Winder)
- 1943 Town Survey 9st1 (L C Brown), also won the 1943 Grand National Hurdles
- 1942 Erndale 10st2 (M N Caddy)
- 1941 Esperance Bay 9st8 (R J Hawes)
- 1940 Streamline 10st (G Ridgway)
- 1939 Charade
- 1938 Erination
- 1937 Sandy Dix
- 1936 Prince Of Orange
- 1935 Stanchion
- 1934 Wee Pat
- 1933 Makeup
- 1932 Landmark
- 1931 Prince Lu
- 1930 Kings Jest
- 1918 Gladful, also won the 1921 Grand National Hurdles

== See also ==
- Grand National Hurdles (New Zealand)
- Grand National Steeplechase (New Zealand)
- Thoroughbred racing in New Zealand
