= Furys Order =

New Zealand-bred Thoroughbred racehorse

FURY'S ORDER
- Sire: Indian Order (GB)
- Grandsire: Crepello (GB)
- Dam: Our Fury (NZ)
- Damsire: Le Filou (FR)
- Sex: Stallion
- Foaled: 1970
- Country: New Zealand
- Colour: Chestnut
- Breeder: ...
- Owner: L H Bridgeman
- Trainer: Wally McEwan...
- Record: 48:16-9-6
- Earnings: A$212,825

Major wins
- W S Cox Plate (1975); New Zealand Cup (1974); New Zealand Derby (1973)
- Last updated on 11 May 2009

Fury's Order (foaled in New Zealand, 1970) was a thoroughbred horse, who raced successfully in New Zealand and Australia.

He is notable for winning major races including the Cox Plate when ridden by Brent Thomson, Australia's premier weight-for-age race, and the New Zealand Cup.

== Big race wins ==
Fury's Order's 16 wins included:

- 1973 Wellington Guineas (ridden by Des Harris) beating Oopik and Paterangi.
- 1973 New Zealand 2000 Guineas (Des Harris) beating Iechyd and Pakistan Flight.
- 1973 New Zealand Derby (Des Harris) beating Jandell and Tinryland Lass.
- 1973 Hawkes Bay Cup (Jim Walker) beating Jackaroo and Guest Star.
- 1974 New Zealand Cup (Jim Walker) beating Roaming and Heckle's Choice.
- 1974 Manawatu Challenge Stakes (Jim Walker) beating Count Kereru and King's Romance.
- 1975 Cox Plate (Brent Thomson) beating Kiwi Can and Analight.

== Death ==
After racing, Fury's Order retired to Stud in Australia, where he achieved only very moderate success. After standing at stud for 5–6 years, he was struck by lightning in his paddock and died instantly.

== See also ==
- Thoroughbred racing in New Zealand
- Horseracing in New Zealand
