= Great New Zealand Steeplechase =

- Class: Prestige jumping
- Location: Te Aroha formerly Ellerslie Racecourse
- Race type: Thoroughbred - Jump Racing

Race information
- Distance: 6200m 6400m (Ellerslie)
- Surface: Turf
- Track: Right-handed
- Qualification: Open
- Weight: Handicap
- Purse: NZ$200,000 (2025)

The Great New Zealand Steeplechase is New Zealand's richest steeplechase jumping race. Until 2025, the race was known as the Great Northern Steeplechase. The race exceeds six kilometres, making it New Zealand's longest horse race, and usually takes over eight minutes to complete. It is one of the great tests of stamina and fitness in thoroughbred racing, for both horse and rider. It is run in winter when the grass tracks are soft or heavy.

== Location and scheduling ==
For most of its life the race was run over 6,400 metres (21,000 ft) at Ellerslie Racecourse in Auckland. The contestants cleared 25 jumps during the 6400m race. A notable feature of the race was the Ellerslie Hill, on the eastern side of the steeplechase course, which the horses must climb three times during the race.

The race was called the DB Draught Steeplechase in the 1990s when sponsored by DB Breweries.

The race has been run in early September since 2005, after previously being held in early June. The Great Northern steeplechase was raced on the same day as the Great Northern Hurdles.

The race was moved to Te Aroha in 2018 and 2021. In 2018, this was due to a track upgrade at Ellerslie, and the race was therefore held over 6300m. In 2021, this was due to COVID-19 restrictions in Auckland and the race was therefore held over 6200m on October 3.

The race is no longer held at Ellerslie after the Auckland Racing Club sold land for housing development. From 2022 to 2024 the race has been held at Te Rapa over 6500m.

In 2025 a "Great Northern" carnival was scheduled with the Hurdles and Steeplechase to be raced at Te Aroha on separate days again, in September. In July 2025 the Great Northern Hurdles and Great Northern Steeplechase were renamed as the Great New Zealand Hurdle and Great New Zealand Steeplechase respectively.

== History ==
The inaugural race was won by Macaroni, who carried a weight of 12 stone (76 kg). The record weight carried to victory was 12 stone 13 lb (82.5 kg) by Kiatere in 1907. One of the most notable winners of the race was Hunterville, who won the race three times in 1983, 1984 and 1985. Hypnotize also achieved three victories, following wins in 2007, 2008 and 2010.

From 1885 until 1925 the Great Northern Steeplechase was raced over three and a half miles and from 1926 to 1946 it was three and three quarters of a mile. The race was increased to four miles from 1947 and became 6400m in 1974.

The fastest winning time was 7:39.35 by Ballycastle in 1978, and the slowest was 9:31.50 by Wise Men Say in 2017. There was a dead-heat in 2001 between Smart Hunter, which had won the Great Northern Hurdles two days earlier, and Sir Avion, which had won the Great Northern Hurdles in 1998. It was the first dead-heat in a major New Zealand jumping race since the Otago Steeplechase in 1918.

Ken and Ann Browne won the Great Northern Steeplechase a record nine times with Ascona (1977 and 1979), Ardri (1990), Brother Bart (1991), Lord Tennyson (1992), Sydney Jones (1995 and 1997), Smart Hunter (2001, dead-heated with Sir Avion) and Wanderlust (2004). After Ken's death, Ann Browne has won the race with Fair King (2009), Ima Heroine (2011) and Tom's Myth (2012).

In 1986 Trudy Thornton was the first woman to ride in a Great Northern Steeplechase. In 1995, Tina Egan was the first woman jockey to win the race.

The 2012 winner, Tom's Myth, was the first horse to win the Wellington Steeplechase, Pakuranga Hunt Cup and Great Northern in the same season.

== Race results ==
Year	Winner	Sire	Dam	Jockey	Trainer(s)	Time	Second	Third
2026 (Te Aroha)	Christmas 65	Palace Episode (USA)	Many Dreams (Fra)	Darryl Horner Jnr	Paul Preusker, Australia	7:48.87 (6200m)	Captains Run 69	Smug 66.5
2025 (Te Aroha)	Jesko 70	Atlante (Aus)	Striking Asset (NZ)	Shaun Fannin	Shaun and Hazel Fannin	7.54.62 (6200m)	Mr Fabulous 66	Te Kahu 68
2024 (Te Rapa)	West Coast 73	Mettre En Jeu	Testament	Shaun Fannin	Mark Oulaghan, Awapuni	8:18.40 (6500m)	Captains Run 66	Auld Jock 66
2023 (Te Rapa)	West Coast 73	Mettre En Jeu	Testament	Shaun Fannin	Mark Oulaghan	8.02.14 (6500m)	Captains Run 66	The Cossack 73
2022 (Te Rapa)	Kiddo 65	Istidaad (USA)	Kitty O'Reilly	Shaun Fannin	Kevin Myers	8:18.64 (6500m)	Donardo 65	The Anarchist 65
2021 (Te Aroha)	Te Kahu 65	Zacinto (GB)	Midnight Owl	Matthew Cropp	Dan O'Leary, Marton	7:43.24 (6200m)	Zartan 65	No Tip 65
2020	Magic Wonder 65	Eighth Wonder (NZ)	Magic Flight	Shaun Fannin	Jo Rathbone	7:42.47	Napoleon 65	Shamal 70
2019	Wise Men Say 69	Yamanin Vital (NZ)	Vaguely Famous	Shaun Fannin	Raymond Connors	8:48.79	Kings Kite 65	Crash Bandicott 66.5
2018 (Te Aroha)	Chocolate Fish 65	Colombia (NZ)	Saveur	Shaun Phelan	Shane Brown	8:08.47 (6300m)	Perry Mason 65	Shamal 68
2017	Wise Men Say 68	Yamanin Vital (NZ)	Vaguely Famous	Isaac Lupton	Raymond Connors	9:31.50	Upper Cut 70.5	Tizza Secret 65
2016	Kick Back 65	Bahhare (USA)	Take Three	Shaun Fannin	Kevin Myers	8:08.65	Almanood Lad 67	Zed Case 65
2015	Jack Romanov 65	Ustinov (Aus)	Colmerino	Richard Cully	Mark Brooks	8:50.20	Snodroptwinkletoes 65	Amanood Lad 70
2014	Amanood Lad 67	Germano (GB)	Anood Dash	Craig Thornton	Ben Foote	9:04.82	Tobouggie Nights 68	Red Hot 65
2013	Rangatira 65	Deputy Governor (USA)	Aggie Grey	Isaac Lupton	Steve Gulliver	8:23.85	Kidunot 68	Karlos 68
2012	Tom's Myth 68	Rainbow Myth (NZ)	Tom's Jewel	Shaun Phelan	Ann Browne	8:25.07	Myths And Legends 67.5	Cape Kinaveral 68
2011	Ima Heroine 63.5	Heroicity (Aus)	Ima Hunter	Mathew Gillies	Ann Browne	8:37.55	Myths And Legends 63	Hypnotize 71.5
2010	Hypnotize 70.5	Yamanin Vital (NZ)	Auburn Rose	Isaac Lupton	Raymond Connors	8:45.50	Karlos 63	Fair King 65.5
2009	Fair King 64.5	Kingfisher Mill (USA)	Fair Sister	James Gillies	Ann Browne	8:02.66	Hypnotize 69.5	Volkswagin 63
2008	Hypnotize 68.5	Yamanin Vital (NZ)	Auburn Rose	Isaac Lupton	Raymond Connors	8:15.71	Franconero 63	Fair King 64
2007	Hypnotize 65	Yamanin Vital (NZ)	Auburn Rose	Isaac Lupton	Raymond Connors	8:24.25	Stitched 66	The Storytella 63
2006	Real Tonic 66.5	Victory Dance (Ire)	Bantan	Brett Scott	John Wheeler	8:50.48	I'manace 63	Fenman 62
2005	Just The Man 62	Isle Of Man (NZ)	Albatross Road	Joanne Rathbone	Davina Waddell	7:41.44	The Storytella 63	Bart 65
2004	Wanderlust 65.5	Globetrotter (NZ)	Hauma	Michelle Hopkins	Ann & Ken Browne MBE, Cambridge	8:18.30	Aquaria Dancer 62	Golden Flare 68
2003	Golden Flare 63	Touching Wood (USA)	Golden Glow	Clayton Chipperfield	Raylene Whiteside	8:05.98	Cool Conductor 63	Royal Ways 65
2002	Golden Flare 60	Touching Wood (USA)	Golden Glow	Clayton Chipperfield	Raylene Whiteside	8:06.02	Cool Conductor 60	Royal Ways 63
2001	Smart Hunter 60.5 (Dead-heat)	Ivory Hunter (USA)	Jeanne's Jest	Michelle Hopkins	Ann & Ken Browne MBE, Cambridge	8:21.45	-	Wickerman 60
2001	Sir Avion 60 (Dead-heat)	Sir Sian (NZ)	Avion	Wayne Hillis	Kevin O'Connor	8:21.45	-	" "
2000	Royal Ways 63.5	Crossways (GB)	Royal Auk	Joseph Douglas	Tony Cole	8:23.17	Our Jonty 64	Fair Brother 64
1999	Royal Ways 60	Crossways (GB)	Royal Auk	Joseph Douglas	Tony Cole	8:09.17	Just Red 60	Sel Tee 62
1998	Our Jonty 64	Random Chance (NZ)	Lal's Gift	Raymond Connors	Kevin Myers	7:51.25	Lost In The Rain 64	Kildary King 61
1997	Sydney Jones 66.5	Sir Sydney (NZ)	Tua Rangi	Brett McDonald	Ann & Ken Browne MBE, Cambridge	8:38.73	Flash Hunter 66	Our Jonty 61
1996	Classic Heights 62	Sir Tristram (Ire)	Catena Gold	Paul Fitzgerald	Tim Douglas	8:18.05	Just Red 64	Joyful Dude 64
1995	Sydney Jones 65	Sir Sydney (NZ)	Tua Rangi	Tina Egan	Ann & Ken Browne MBE, Cambridge	8:39.16	Joyful Dude 65	Classic Heights 60
1994	Ellivani 64.5	Palm Beach (Fra)	Ina Ville	Brian Constable	John Twomey	7:47.18	Bwana 64	Propel 62
1993	Sir Barton 63.5	Sir Bart (NZ)	Confront	Chad Northcott	Max Northcott	8:06.56	Bwana 64	Red Impact 61
1992	Lord Tennyson 60.5	Royal Plume (GB)	Noode	Brett McDonald	Ann & Ken Browne MBE, Cambridge	8:07.38	The Image Maker 60.3	Desperino 60.8
1991	Brother Bart 60.5	Sir Bart (NZ)	Sister Sarah	Craig Thornton	Ann & Ken Browne MBE, Cambridge	8:16.60	The Image Maker 59.5	Brigadier Puckle 60.8
1990	Ardri 59.5	Bally Royal (GB)	Aramusha	Ken Browne	Ann & Ken Browne MBE, Cambridge	8:33.53	Zamarino 60	Count Five 64
1989	Tumblin’ Down 61	Dodger (NZ)	Maria Dallas	Toby Autridge	Michael Moroney	8:20.29	Yamani 61	High Impact 60.3
1988	Heddawin 59.3	Head Hunter (GB)	Winagan	Wayne Hillis	John Bullock	8:10.41	Vincere 60.5	Seeyoulater 60.5
1987	Deductable 59.5	Kirrama (NZ)	Happy Return	Paul Hillis	Colin Jillings & Richard Yuill	8:22.40	Orca 61.3	Seeyoulater 61
1986	Rock Crystal 59.5	Native Turn (USA)	Princess Mellay (NZ)	A M (Snooky) Cowan	Hector Anderton	8:14.23	Lord Venture 59.5	Kanamint 64
1985	Hunterville 66.5	Treason Trial (Ire)	Wedding Ring (NZ)	Denis Gray	Ron Cropp	7:52.02	Orca 58.5	Resolution 64.5
1984	Hunterville 65.5	Treason Trial (Ire)	Wedding Ring (NZ)	Denis Gray	Ron Cropp	8:18.58	Dulico 59.8	Civil Rights 57.8
1983	Hunterville 62	Treason Trial (Ire)	Wedding Ring (NZ)	Denis Gray	Ron Cropp	8:01.99	Headford 58.8	Sparkling Brew 57
1982	Mountain Gold 59	Rocky Mountain (Fra)	Gold Gwen (NZ)	Laurie Cavanagh	Tim Douglas	8:13.05	Hunterville 57	Regenerate 61.5
1981	Bean's Beau 63	Head Hunter (GB)	Buzzami (NZ)	Bryce Waters	John Bullock	7:59.47 (soft)	Patrone 65	Aurlada 57
1980	Guess Who 63.5	Royal Ridge	Quita	Stephen Jenkins	Eric Temperton	8:27.56	Thumbs Orf 64	Patrone 62.5
1979	Ascona 60			Ken Browne	Ken Browne	8:19.32	Al Rashid	First Wood
1978	Ballycastle 63			Grant Cooksley	Brian Elliot	7:39.35	Marji's Gold	Ascona
1977	Ascona 57.5			Ken Browne	Ken Browne	8:52.00		
1976	Loch Linnhe 69	Lomond	Night Bell	Brian Tims	W J (Bill) Hillis	8:08.6	Vitraglaze	Ballymore
1975	Loch Linnhe 65.5	Lomond	Night Bell	W J (Bill) Hillis	W J (Bill) Hillis	8:00	Monty	Young Surveyor
1974	Specialist 57.5			Graeme Walters	Peter Cathro	7:51	Burglar Bill	Captain Sandy
1973	Bob's Luck 9st			G N Scanlon		8:00		
1972	Brockton 9st 12			Brian ("Baggy") Hillis		8:10		
1971	Brockton 9st			Brian ("Baggy") Hillis		8:10		

== Historical winners ==
Winning horses and jockeys include the following:

- 1970 - Spray Doone (C R Lewis), also won the 1970 Grand National Steeplechase
- 1969 - Falada (F P Blackburn)
- 1968 - Royal Polo (L J Gestro)
- 1967 - Eiffel Tower (W J "Bill" Hillis), also won the 1966 and 1967 Grand National Hurdles
- 1966 - Confer (R J Sutherland)
- 1965 - Smoke Ring (R J Leggett)
- 1964 - Johnny Dee (J H Hely)
- 1963 - Blue Rock (A T Haitana), also won the 1961 Grand National Hurdles
- 1962 - Sabre (J R Potter)
- 1961 - Patrick Molloy (J H Hely)
- 1960 - Patrick Molloy (G O Mudgway)
- 1959 - Ben Vola (V H Simpson)
- 1958 - Irish Ace (A G Walsh)
- 1957 - Knight's Star (J R Potter)
- 1956 - Hit Parade (T Reynolds)
- 1955 - Every Time (A G Walsh)
- 1954 - Dunwold (J A Woolliams)
- 1953 - Dunwold (R J Turnwald)
- 1952 - Dural (A K Lawrence)
- 1951 - Redingote (D Mackinnon)
- 1950 - Jon Rosa (R D Samson)
- 1949 - Golden Reign (J L Jenkins)
- 1948 - Brookby Song (J Chaplin), also won the 1948 Wellington Steeplechase and Grand National Steeplechase
- 1947 - Brookby Song (J Chaplin)
- 1946 - Our Nation (F C Cleaver)
- 1945 - Dauber (A Jenkins)
- 1944 - Dozie Boy (M E Ritchie)
- 1943 - Chat (Eric Temperton)
- 1942 - Dozie Boy (A Jenkins)
- 1941 - Streamline (G Ridgway)
- 1940 - All Irish (J H McRae)
- 1939 - Survey (A E Ellis)
- 1938 - Valpeen (F R Foster)
- 1937 - Irish Comet ( J F Fergus)
- 1936 - Billy Boy (W Rennie)
- 1935 - Royal Limond (D O’Connor)
- 1934 - Valpeen (R Thompson)
- 1933 - Callamart (C Thomson)
- 1932 - Copey (I Tucker)
- 1931 - Master Lu (J H McRae)
- 1930 - Aurora Borealis (A McDonald)
- 1929 - Uralia (F Foster)
- 1928 - Glendowie (S Henderson)
- 1927 - Beau Cavalier (S Henderson)
- 1926 - Dick (R Thompson)
- 1925 - Sir Rosebery (A McDonald)
- 1924 - Sir Rosebery (E Copestake)
- 1923 - Mary Bruce (S Henderson)
- 1922 - Sea De'il (T W Rowe)
- 1921 - Coalition (A Wormald)
- 1920 - Lochella (G Fielding)
- 1919 - Master Lupin (A McDonald)
- 1918 - Waimai (F Flynn)
- 1917 - Gluepot (S Henderson)
- 1916 - El Gallo (C Scott)
- 1915 - El Gallo (C Scott)
- 1914 - Peary (F McCabe)
- 1913 - Bercola (J O’Connell)
- 1912 - Hautere (J Deery)
- 1911 - Corazon (J Hercock)
- 1910 - Red McGregor (W Windsor)
- 1909 - Capitol (M Deeble)
- 1908 - Loch Fyne (A Julian)
- 1907 - Kiatere (W Wilson)
- 1906 - Sol (W Wilson)
- 1905 - Kiatere (Percy Johnson)
- 1904 - Moccasin (J Quinton)
- 1903 - Haydn (S Fergus), also won the 1901 Grand National Hurdles and 1902 Grand National Steeplechase
- 1902 - The Guard (A Hall)
- 1901 - Moifaa (D Watt), also winner of the 1904 Grand National in Aintree, England and inducted into the New Zealand Racing Hall of Fame in 2014
- 1900 - Voltigeur II (F Burns)
- 1899 - Dummy (Percy Johnson)
- 1898 - Muscatel (Percy Johnson)
- 1897 - Levanter (J Rae)
- 1896 - Levanter (J Rae)
- 1895 - Liberator (Free Holmes)
- 1894 - Bombardier (D Monaghan)
- 1893 - Despised (K Heaton)
- 1892 - Shillelagh (Williams)
- 1891 - Parnell (McManemin)
- 1890 - Jenny (Percy Johnson)
- 1889 - Don (Collins)
- 1888 - Allegro (Edgecumbe)
- 1887 - Silvio (Russell)
- 1886 - Belle (Frewin)
- 1885 - Macaroni (A Lyford)

== See also ==
- Grand National Steeplechase (New Zealand)
- Grand National Hurdles (New Zealand)
- Thoroughbred racing in New Zealand
