= St Reims =

New Zealand-bred Thoroughbred racehorse

- Sire: Zabeel
- Grandsire: Sir Tristram
- Dam: L'Quiz
- Damsire: L'Enjoleur
- Sex: Colt
- Foaled: 9 November 1999
- Country: New Zealand
- Colour: Bay
- Breeder: Lady Justine & Sir Patrick Hogan
- Owner: February Syndicate
- Trainer: Chris McNab
- Record: 36:11-6-0
- Earnings: $673,250

Major wins
- New Zealand Derby (2002); Zabeel Classic (2005)
- Last updated on July 3, 2007

St Reims (foaled 9 November 1999 in New Zealand) is a thoroughbred racehorse who won the New Zealand Derby in 2002.

He was a million-dollar yearling and the son of Zabeel. He broke his maiden at his fifth start. A runaway win in the Avondale Guineas at his last start before the Derby ensured that he would start favourite in the Classic. Given a ride out in front by Greg Childs, the colt was never headed and scored a narrow win.

After the Derby his career went downhill. After disappointing performances in an autumn Sydney campaign, St Reims failed to win a single race as a four-year-old. But at Hastings in the spring of 2004 he put together a string of wins against horses the quality of Waitoki Dream and Zafar, culminating in a return to Group race success in the Lindauer Grandeur Stakes at Ellerslie, the scene of his Derby triumph.

He followed that win up with the Group 2 Counties Cup, a close second in the Group 2 Waikato Cup and a second Group 1 victory in the 2005 Zabeel Classic at Ellerslie, beating Distinctly Secret and Lashed.

Following another Group 1 placing behind Xcellent in the Darley Stakes and a seventh behind the same horse in the Kelt Capital Stakes, he was retired to stand at Stoney Bridge Stud.

== Stud career ==
St Reims had his first winner as a sire when two-year-old filly St J'adore, from his first crop, won a maiden race at Avondale on 7 May 2010.

His progeny included:

- Bad Boy Brown, winner of the 2019 Great Northern Hurdles.
- Tallyho Twinkletoe, winner of the 2015 Grand National Hurdles (4250m), the 2021 Grand National Steeplechase (5600m), 2021 Koral Steeplechase (4250m) and multiple prestige steeplechases in Australia.
