= Riccarton Park Racecourse =

Horse racecourse in Christchurch, New Zealand

Coordinates: 43°31′41″S 172°32′40″E

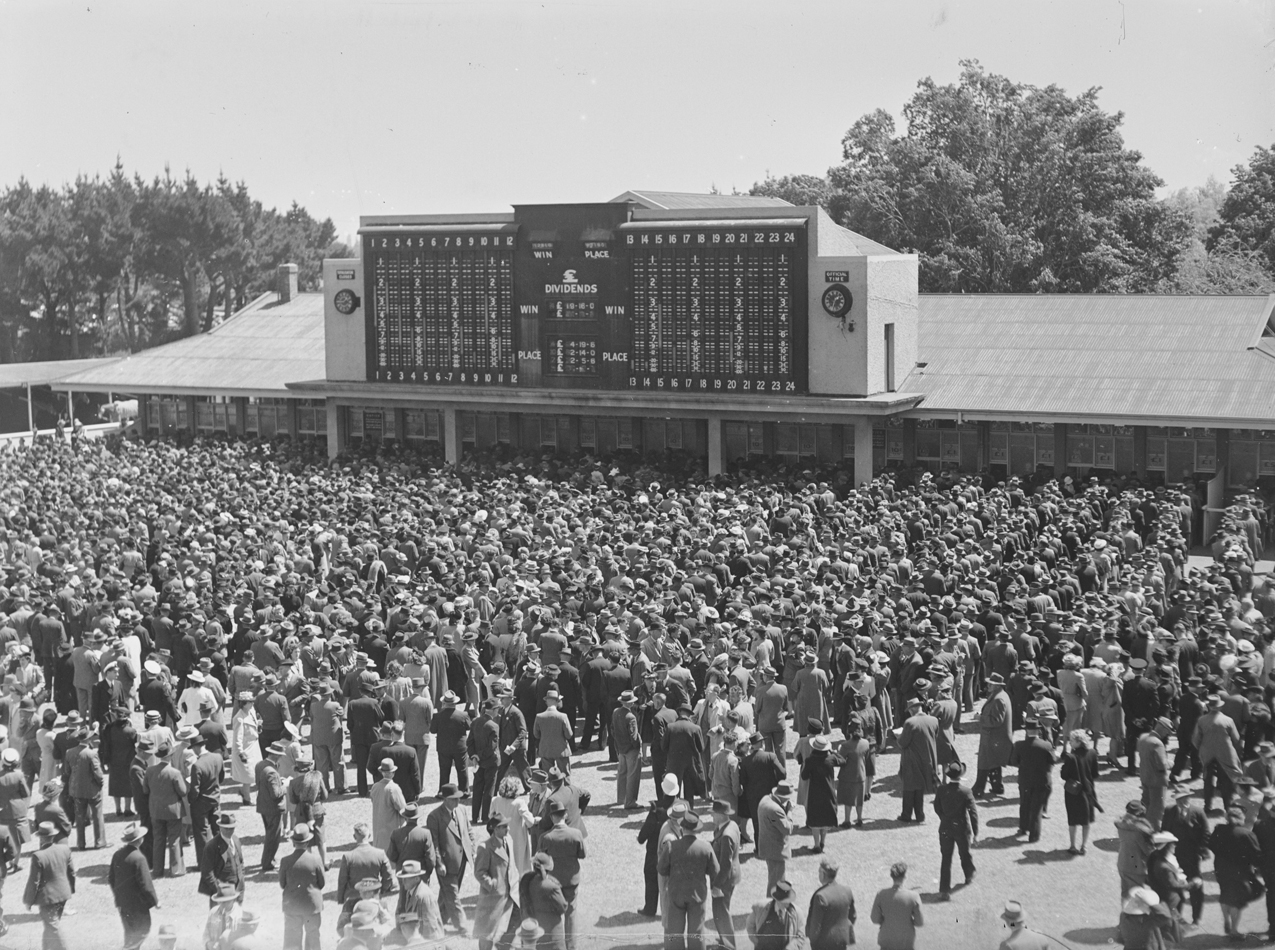
A crowd watches the Totalisator board in the 1940s

Riccarton Park Racecourse is the main thoroughbred horse racecourse for the Christchurch city area in New Zealand.

== History ==
The Canterbury Jockey Club was established in 1854 and held its first meeting at Hagley Park in Easter 1855. The Riccarton racecourse was reserved as a public recreation ground by the Canterbury Provincial Council in 1858 and leased to the Jockey Club.

Riccarton Racecourse became the home of the New Zealand Cup in 1867.

The Tea House and the Public Grandstand were designed by local architects, Alfred and Sidney Luttrell.

In October 2022, it was reported the Canterbury Jockey Club had been granted permission to demolish the 100-year old grandstand, despite opposition from heritage campaigners.

== Main races ==
On the Saturday prior to Canterbury Show and Cup week in November:

- The Group 1 New Zealand 2000 Guineas run over 1600m for 3yo horses,
- The Listed Metropolitan Trophy Handicap, an Open handicap over 2500m.
- The Listed Pegasus Stakes, an Open handicap over 1000m.

On the Wednesday of the Canterbury Show and Cup week:

- The Group 3 Canterbury Breeders Stakes, a set weight plus penalties race for fillies and mares run over 1400m.
- The Group 3 Stewards Stakes Handicap, an Open Handicap raced over 1200m.
- The Group 2 Coupland Bakeries Mile (1600m), an Open Handicap.

On the Saturday of the Canterbury Show and Cup week:

- The Group 3 New Zealand Cup run over 3200m (2 miles).
- The Group 1 New Zealand 1000 Guineas run over 1600m for 3yo fillies.
- The Listed Welcome Stakes, a 2-year old set weight race over 1000m.

In August:

- The Grand National Steeplechase, first run in 1875, which is 5600m.
- The Grand National Hurdles, run over 4200m.
- The Group 3 Winter Cup, an Open Handicap over 1600m.

In September:

- The listed Canterbury Belle Stakes for 3-year-old fillies over 1200m.

== Demographics ==
The Riccarton Racecourse statistical area includes a residential area between the racecourse and the commercial area of Hornby, New Zealand. Including the racecourse, it covers 1.69 km^{2} (0.65 sq mi). It had an estimated population of 2,320 as of June 2025, with a population density of 1,373 people per km^{2}.

Historical population
Year	Pop.	±% p.a.
2006	1,170	—
2013	1,215	+0.54%
2018	1,206	−0.15%
2023	2,028	+10.95%

Riccarton Racecourse had a population of 2,028 in the 2023 New Zealand census, an increase of 822 people (68.2%) since the 2018 census, and an increase of 813 people (66.9%) since the 2013 census. There were 1,008 males, 1,011 females, and 9 people of other genders in 798 dwellings. 3.3% of people identified as LGBTIQ+. The median age was 34.2 years (compared with 38.1 years nationally). There were 339 people (16.7%) aged under 15 years, 501 (24.7%) aged 15 to 29, 858 (42.3%) aged 30 to 64, and 330 (16.3%) aged 65 or older.

People could identify as more than one ethnicity. The results were 59.8% European (Pākehā); 9.0% Māori; 7.2% Pasifika; 30.6% Asian; 3.4% Middle Eastern, Latin American and African New Zealanders (MELAA); and 1.5% other, which includes people giving their ethnicity as "New Zealander". English was spoken by 93.0%, Māori by 1.6%, Samoan by 3.4%, and other languages by 26.2%. No language could be spoken by 3.0% (e.g. too young to talk). New Zealand Sign Language was known by 0.7%. The percentage of people born overseas was 36.4, compared with 28.8% nationally.

Religious affiliations were 36.1% Christian, 3.7% Hindu, 2.8% Islam, 0.7% Māori religious beliefs, 1.5% Buddhist, 0.3% New Age, 0.1% Jewish, and 2.7% other religions. People who answered that they had no religion were 45.3%, and 6.7% of people did not answer the census question.

Of those at least 15 years old, 411 (24.3%) people had a bachelor's or higher degree, 777 (46.0%) had a post-high school certificate or diploma, and 495 (29.3%) people exclusively held high school qualifications. The median income was $42,800, compared with $41,500 nationally. 126 people (7.5%) earned over $100,000 compared to 12.1% nationally. The employment status of those at least 15 was 936 (55.4%) full-time, 207 (12.3%) part-time, and 39 (2.3%) unemployed.

== See also ==
- Thoroughbred racing in New Zealand
- Trentham Racecourse
- Ellerslie Racecourse
- Addington Raceway
- Glossary of Australian and New Zealand punting
- New Zealand Racing Hall of Fame
