= Autumn Stakes (MRC) =

- Class: Group 2
- Location: Caulfield Racecourse, Sandown
- Inaugurated: 1979
- Race type: Thoroughbred
- Sponsor: Hyland Race Colours (2026)

Race information
- Distance: 1,400 metres
- Surface: Turf
- Track: Left-handed
- Qualification: Three year old
- Weight: Set weights with penalties
- Purse: $300,000 (2026)

The Autumn Stakes is a Melbourne Racing Club Group 2 Thoroughbred horse race for three-year-olds, at set weights with penalties, over a distance of 1400 metres at Caulfield Racecourse, Melbourne, Australia run in February.

== History ==
=== Name ===
- 1979–1990 - Autumn Stakes
- 1991 - Tattersall's Stakes
- 1992–1995 - Autumn Stakes
- 1996–1997 - Japan Racing Association Autumn Stakes
- 1998–2001 - Autumn Stakes
- 2002 - Australia Day Vase
- 2003–2004 - Autumn Stakes
- 2005–2007 - Schweppervescence Cup
- 2008 - Perri Cutten Cup
- 2009–2011 - D'Urban Stakes
- 2012 onwards - Autumn Stakes

=== Distance ===
- 1979–1986 – 1200 metres
- 1987 onwards - 1400 metres

=== Grade ===
- 1968–1978 - Unlisted race
- 1979 - Listed race
- 1980–2007 - Group 3
- 2008 onwards - Group 2

=== Venue ===
- 1966–1985 - Sandown Racecourse
- 1986 - Caulfield Racecourse
- 1987–1996 - Sandown Racecourse
- 1997–2022 - Caulfield Racecourse
- 2023 - Sandown Racecourse

== Winners ==
The following are past winners of the race.

- 2026 - Observer
- 2025 - Angel Capital
- 2024 - Snow Patrol
- 2023 – Glint of Silver
- 2022 – Coastwatch
- 2021 – Poland
- 2020 – Microphone
- 2019 – Hawkshot
- 2018 – Holy Snow
- 2017 – Oak Door
- 2016 – Mahuta
- 2015 – San Nicasio
- 2014 – Thunder Fantasy
- 2013 – Mulaazem
- 2012 – Pied A Terre
- 2011 – Dusty Star
- 2010 – Denman
- 2009 – Fravashi
- 2008 – Light Fantastic
- 2007 – Catechuchu
- 2006 – Apache Cat
- 2005 – Shinzig
- 2004 – Special Harmony
- 2003 – Titanic Jack
- 2002 – Dash For Cash
- 2001 – Desert Sky
- 2000 – Sudurka
- 1999 – Dignity Dancer
- 1998 – Blaze The Turf
- 1997 – Tampir Lane
- 1996 – Nick On The Run
- 1995 – St Covet
- 1994 – Royal Rubiton
- 1993 – Just Juan
- 1992 – Laranto
- 1991 – Canny Lad
- 1990 – The Oval
- 1989 – King's High
- 1988 – Havelock's Pride
- 1987 – Northern Copy
- 1986 – Beach Gown
- 1985 – Testimony
- 1984 – Centaine
- 1983 – Lord Ballina
- 1982 – Pure Of Heart
- 1981 – Deck The Halls
- 1980 – Tolhurst
- 1979 – Gondolier

== See also ==
- List of Australian Group races
- Group races
