= New Zealand Cup =

Annual Thoroughbred horse race in Christchurch, New Zealand

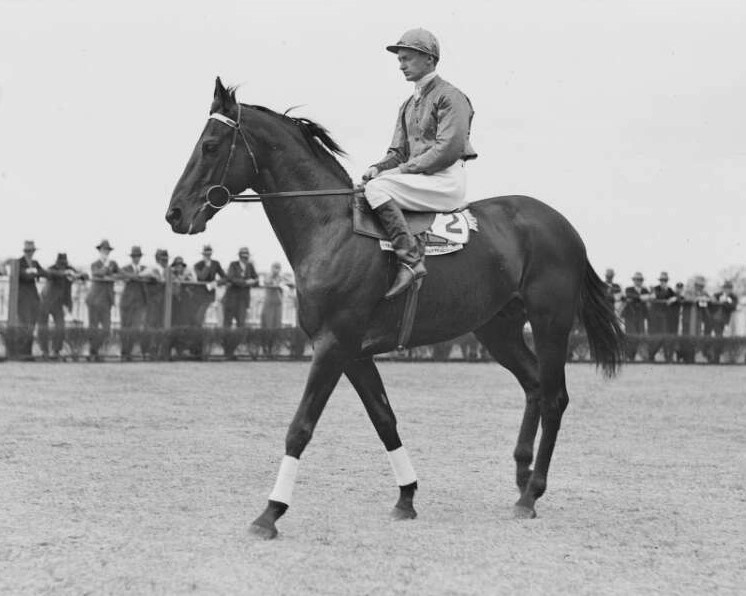
- Nightmarch, 1930 winner
- Class: Group III
- Location: Riccarton Park Racecourse; Christchurch, New Zealand
- Inaugurated: 1865
- Race type: Thoroughbred – Flat racing
- Website: www.riccartonpark.co.nz

Race information
- Distance: 3200m (2 miles)
- Surface: Turf
- Track: Left-handed
- Qualification: Three-year-olds and up
- Weight: Handicap
- Purse: $450,000 (2025)

The New Zealand Cup is a thoroughbred horse race run at the Riccarton Park Racecourse in Christchurch.

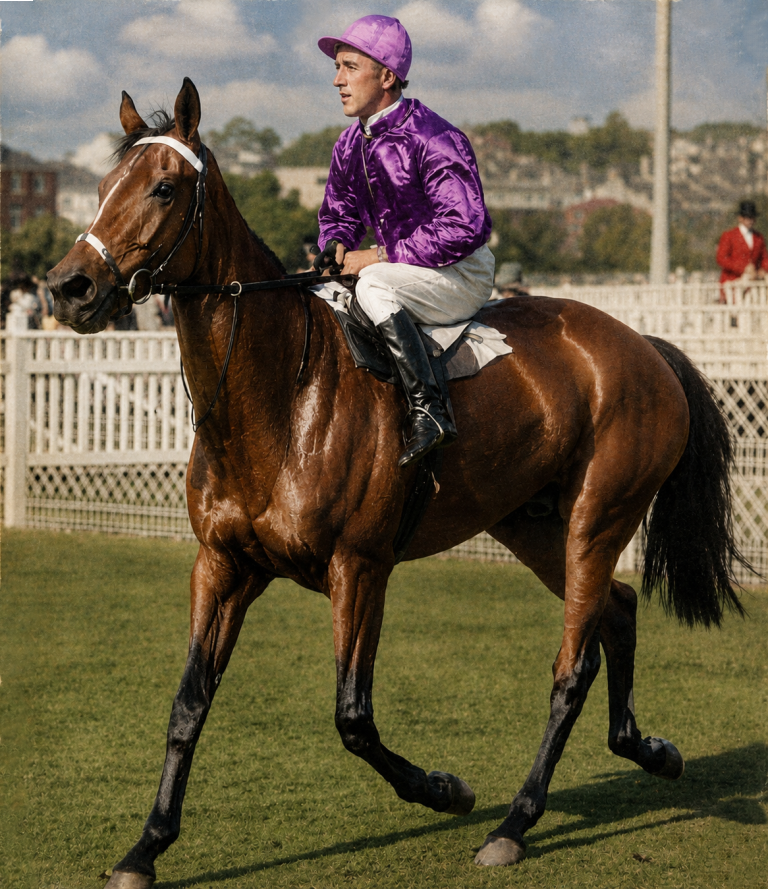
Cuddle, 1935 winner

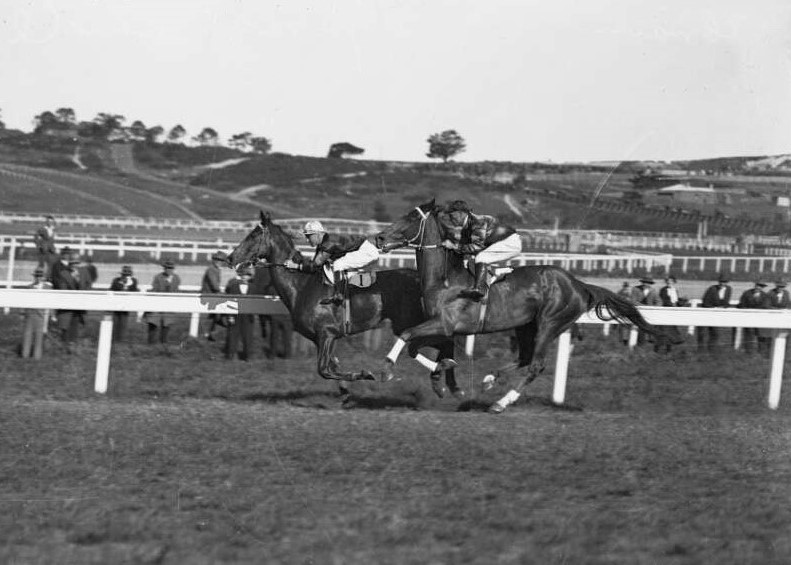
Chide, 1929 winner.

== New Zealand Cup week ==
The New Zealand Cup is raced on the final Saturday of Christchurch "Cup week" held each year in the second week of November.

For thoroughbred horses the week also features:

- the New Zealand 1000 Guineas for 3 year old fillies,
- the New Zealand 2000 Guineas for 3 year olds,
- the Stewards Handicap sprint, and
- the TAB Mile (formerly the Coupland's Bakeries Mile).

Christchurch Cup week includes premier standardbred meetings at Addington raceway including:

- the New Zealand Trotting Cup for pacers on the Tuesday.
- the New Zealand Free For All for pacers on the Friday.
- the Dominion Handicap for trotters on the Friday.

Up until 2025 there was also greyhound racing on the Thursday, including the following Group 1 races:

- the New Zealand Galaxy - C5f 295m ($40,000 stake)
- the New Zealand Greyhound Cup - C5f 525m ($100,000)
- the New Zealand Stayers Cup - C2df 732m ($40,000)

Greyhound racing was banned by the New Zealand Government with effect from 1 August 2026.

== History of the New Zealand Cup ==
The New Zealand Cup is one of the oldest races in New Zealand having been run each year since 1865. It is a race for stayers, over 3200 metres, which is also the distance of the Auckland Cup, Wellington Cup as well as some major Australian races such as the Melbourne Cup.

Despite it dropping over time from a Group 1 race down to Group 3 status, it remains one of the most popular racing events in New Zealand with the 150th running in 2013.

Maree Lyndon was the first female jockey to win a Group I race in New Zealand when winning the 1982 Cup on Sirtain.

Notable winners include:

- Blood Brotha (2011 and 2012), the 2013 Wellington Cup winner.
- Cuddle (1935), 2× winner of the Auckland Cup and the Doncaster Handicap.
- Empire Rose (1987), the 1988 Melbourne Cup winner.
- Fury's Order (1974), the 1975 Cox Plate winner.
- Nightmarch (1930), winner of the 1929 Cox Plate and Melbourne Cup.
- Samasaan (1985), the 1986 Wellington Cup winner.
- Sapio (1995 and 1998), the winner of the 1997 Tattersall's Cup (Eagle Farm) and Doomben Cup.
- Sasanof (1918), two years after becoming the first New Zealand owned, trained, and bred Melbourne Cup winner.
- Watallan (1973), winning the Cup as a 10 year old, for his 21st victory from 111 starts, and paying a $98 dividend.

=== Group Status ===
- 1865–1977 (Principal Race)
- 1978–1990 (Group 1)
- 1991–2008 (Group 2)
- 2009–present (Group 3)

== Race results ==
Year	Horse	Wgt	Sire	Dam	Dam Sire	Jockey	Owner(s)	Trainer(s)	Time	Second	Third
2026	Just Charlie	53	Zed (NZ)	Goody Two Shoes (NZ)	Danasinga (Aus)	Lily Sutherland	M J & R D Southey	Kevin Myers	3:21.97 (soft)	Trav 53	With Grace 53
2025	Bozo	54	Satono Aladdin	So Ard	High Chaparral	Tina Comignaghi	Rick, Sandra & Anne Hill	Kevin Myers	3:33.05 (heavy)	Prince Alby 54	Canheroc 54
2024	Mehzebeen	53	Almanzor	Salkantay (NZ)	Zabeel	Craig Grylls	Sarai Stud, M & Y Davis, D & S Rolston, S Waddell, R & B Duncan, T & K Howe	Mark Walker & Sam Bergerson	3.27.40 (soft)	Beavertown Boy 53	Canheroc 53
2023	Mahrajaan	55	Kitten's Joy	Lahudood	Singspiel (Ire)	Sam Weatherley	G I Barnett, G W Bates, R Cooper, P J Cranitch, G M Jennings, G G Peterson, S F Ritchie, C J Talbot, E J Wood & Est late S F Massey	Shaune Ritchie & Colm Murray, Cambridge	3:25.28 (good)	Nest Egg 53	Waisake 53.5
2022	Aljay	55	Rock 'n' Pop	Albacora	Lord Ballina (Aus)	Tina Comignaghi	L J Gestro & K T Myers	Kevin Myers, Wanganui	3:22.27 (soft)	Inmyshadow 57	Mauna Loa 54
2021	Mondorani	54	Burgundy	Del Mondo	More Than Ready (USA)	Sarah Macnab	J N & Mrs K L Murdoch	Kevin Myers, Wanganui	3:27.18 (soft)	Beaudz Well 54.5	Leaderboard 54
2020	Dragon Storm	53	Shocking	Prize Lady	Prized (USA)	Craig Grylls	A C Consultant and Investment Ltd, C Y Chen, Karaka Mews Development Ltd & Pegasus Bloodstock Ltd	Chris Gibbs	3:21.52 (soft)	Lincoln King 54.5	Hurry Cane 57
2019	Dee And Gee	53	Darci Brahma	Gabana	Jungle Pocket (Jap)	Leah Hemi	Terrill Charles & Peter Corbett	Terrill Charles & Peter Corbett	3:23.05 (dead)	Kaharau (AUS) 58.5	Gorbachev 55
2018	Bizzwinkle	56.5	Rip Van Winkle	Bizz	Volksraad (GB)	Sam Spratt	G J Craig, S W Hawkings, D & P Hughes, A E Kaminski, E Kaye, C N & P A Kemp, Kilgravin Lodge, D S Kinnear, T Lee, C T P Middleton, G E Petersen	Glenn Old	3:22.58	Duplicity 53	Felaar 53
2017	Gobstopper	53.5	Tavistock	Bagalollies (Aus)	Zabeel	Sam Spratt	C D Allison, C V & J A Barnao, A R Campbell, T G Heptinstall, T M Pivac & D R Platt	Andrew Campbell	3:23.79	Pentathlon 59	Kaharau 59
2016	Pump Up The Volume	57.5	Savabeel	Nat The Brat	Racing Is Fun (USA)	Kelly McCulloch	A B Coombe & R R Manning	Ralph Manning	3:23.43	Perfect Start 53	Imperium 53
2015	Jimmy Mac	53	Zed	Go Annie Go	Racing Is Fun (USA)	Lisa Allpress	G & L Andrew, P McGillicuddy, M Richardson & C White	Gene Andrew	3:21.01 Good	Southern Sav 53	Benzini 59
2014	Mungo Jerry	54.5	Don Eduardo	Grovana	Grosvenor	Kelly McCulloch	Makaraka Bloodstock Ltd	Adrian & Harry Bull, Hunterville	3:23.88 Good	Esprit D’Or 54	She's Insatiable 53.5
2013	Spring Cheer	53	Bachelor Duke (USA)	Guardian Angel	Groom Dancer, USA	Rosie Myers	The Oaks Stud	Kevin Myers, Wanganui	3:19.92 Good	Go Joeli 53	Guns At Five 59
2012	Blood Brotha	53	Danzighill (Aus)	Laura Dee	Personal Escort	Lisa Allpress	Mark S & Raymond M Connors	Raymond Connors, Wanganui	3:19.56 Good	Single Minded 54.5	Cottonwood Sky 53
2011	Blood Brotha	53.5	Danzighill (Aus)	Laura Dee	Personal Escort	James McDonald	Mark S & Raymond M Connors	Raymond Connors, Wanganui	3:29.24 Heavy	The Jungle Boy 53.5	The Hand Of Faith 53.5
2010	Showcause (AUS)	52.5	Giant's Causeway (USA)	Showella	Lord Ballina (Aus)	Darryl Bradley	Showcause Syndicate	Frank Ritchie	3:19.75 Good	Titch 55	Zabene 54.5
2009	My Scotsgrey	53	Golan (Ire)	My Chameleon	Grosvenor	Leith Innes	GG Syndicate Ltd, RM Reid, SF Ritchie, WM Schoonderwoerd, RJ Stroud, G Syminton, Mrs CB & MA Todd	Shaune Ritchie	3:20.64 Good	Zabene 53	Smoking Chimneys 53
2008	Hoorang	54.5	Zerpour	Kay Maree	Zerpour (Ire)	Kelly Myers	IA Shaw	Ian Shaw, Wanganui	3:18.11 Good	Young Centaur 56.5	Vickezz chardonnay 51.5
2007	Everswindell	55	Align	Hilarion Lady	St Hilarion (USA)	Noel Harris	Three Fillies Syndicate	John Sargent, Matamata	3:21.55 Good	Bringbackthebiff 53.5	Tedriffic 53
2006	Pentathon	57	Pentire (GB)	Star Royal	Grosvenor	Noel Harris	RS Baulcomb, MK Ralsten	John Wheeler	3:22.71 Dead	Cluden Creek 55.5	American Gothic (GB) 55
2005	Trebla	52.5	Yamanin Vital	Otaki Princess	Noble Bijou	Leith Innes	JH & Mrs SD Pattie	Del Roberts	3:24.55 Good	Northern Beau 57	Live Arte Reality 54.5
2004	Waltermitty	52	Grosvenor	Daria's Fun	Go Fun	Brian Hibberd	P Holland, V Matijasevich, ME Ralston & J Wheeler	John Wheeler, New Plymouth	3:19.54 Firm	Normandy Boy 50.5	Empyreal 50
2003	Torlesse	57	Volksraad	Seamist	Beaufort Sea	Terry Moseley	Ngapuke Stables Syndicate	Mandy Brown	3:20.80 Firm	Cabella 57	Galway Lass 54
2002	Mike	54	Myocard	Re Enact	Kingsbridge	Noel Harris	HJ & Mrs MJ & MP Rutz	Paul Harris	3:24.51 Dead	Baloney 54	Torlesse 52
2001	Soldier Blue	54	Sir Sian	Va Bene	Sovereign Ruler	Gary Grylls	Alistaire and Isabel Barker	Royce Dowling	3:17.97	Emayr 54	On Call 52
2000	Smiling Like	53	Star Way (GB)	Eustaci	Sir Tristram	Michael Walker	Sir Patrick & Lady Hogan	Graeme Rogerson and Keith Hawtin	3:24.90	Count Cristo 53	Java Siang 54
1999	Wake Forest	51.5	Cache Of Gold	Private Poppy	Staff Sergeant	Noel Harris	MA Collinson, PG Maher & PJ Walker	Gus Clutterbuck, Awapuni	3:19.87 Easy	Paddy Maloney 50	Pentium Speed 52.5
1998	Sapio	59	Vice Regal	Sage	Alligrit	Darryl Bradley	PJ & Mrs SL Kay	Sylvia Kay, Otaki	3:17.81 Good	Bonsai Pipeline 59	King D’Or 52.5
1997	Laud Peregrine	49.5	Laud Eulogy	Some Bird	Bold Venture	Leanne Rutherford	GS Oldbury & Estate A D Worth	Ralph Manning	3:17.99 Good	I'm Excited 50	Sopherim 51
1996	Old Thymer	52.5	Imperial Guard	Stitch 'N Thyme	Approval (GB)	Jan Cameron	Mrs Isla M Thompson	Kelly Thompson, Longbush	3:17.47 Firm	Bonsai Pipeline 50.5	Sir Ailahtan 54.5
1995	Sapio	55.5	Vice Regal	Sage	Alligrit	Brian Hibberd	P J & Mrs SL Kay	Sylvia Kay, Otaki	3:20.40 Good	Dozen Roses 56	Windsor Prince 52
1994	Double Take	54	Phizam	Blondie	Hasty Cloud (Ire)	Chris Johnson	JD Ancell	Royce Dowling & Mrs Linda Laing, Cambridge	3:17.88 Firm	Friendly Henry 49.5	Tui Akarana 52
1993	Karaoke	52.5	Happy Melody	Buzz Off	Sir Fleet (USA)	Brian Hibberd	Tudor Syndicates No. 1 & 2	Bruce Marsh, Woodville	3:24.99 Firm	Prince Haze 54	Castletown 59
1992	Mercator	56	Sea Anchor	Pretty Marinda	Rocky Mountain (Fra)	Chris Johnson	LM McKelvie	Royce & Linda Dowling, Cambridge	3:20.07 Fast	Gallant Prince 49	Waiau Pal 53.5
1991	Carlton King	55	Sir Fleet	Rae's Choice	Blarney Kiss (USA)	Matthew Enright	E S & Mrs L E M Aroa & R T Boyce	Miss Diane Sergeant, Hastings	3:19.12 Firm	Prince Haze 55	Cameron 52
1990	Soundoration	50.75	Sound Reason	Eulogy Maid	Pakistan II (GB)	Grant Davison	Southern No.1 Syndicate	Garth Jackson, Riccarton	3:17.22	Our Caddy 53	Red Fox 50.5
1989	Exocet	53	War Hawk II	Grand Zam	Zamazaan (Fra)	Brian Hibberd	MA & MG Peacock	Andrew Peacock, Hawke's Bay	3:19.82	Miss Stanima 49	King Kenora 51
1988	Gallipoli	54.5	Palatable (USA)	Quake	Pictavia	Garry Phillips	JE Bowden & WM Burgess	Patrick Busuttin, Foxton	3:27.82	Eye Full 53.5	Shannon Lad 54
1987	Empire Rose	52.5	Sir Tristram (Ire)	Summer Fleur	Sovereign Edition	Tony Allan	Whakanui Stud Ltd	Laurie Laxon, Cambridge	3:20.20 Good	Prince Avila 53.5	Blazing Voodoo 49
1986	Oak Vue	51	Oakville	St Tropez	Entrepreneur (GB)	Grant Cooksley	Mrs S Wylies	Ralph Manning	3:18.79	Blyme 53.5	Gold Zam 49
1985	Samasaan	50	Zamazaan	Desert Love	Home Guard (USA)	Chris Johnson	Mike Bell, Ian H Harrison & Garth A Jackson	Garth Jackson, Riccarton	3:17.55	Secured Deposit 57	Stylish Dude 51.5
1984	Our Boyfriend	53.5	Roi Lear	Country Flapper	Agricola (GB)	Mark Barnsley	Mr & Mrs NT, Mr & Mrs OA Wyeth	Mrs Marlene Todd, Hastings	3:20.15	Manchu 55.5	Belfe 51
1983	Payco	52	Heir Apparent II	Ribroyal	Ribotlight (GB)	Brian Hibberd	Mesdames JP Brown & JE Chamberlain	Scott Hammersley, Woodville	3:19.31 Fast	Prince Of Wales 53.5	Gun For Fun 55
1982	Sirtain	53	Retained II	Sirenic	Sabaean (GB)	Maree Lyndon	IM & Mrs Northcott	Max Northcott, New Plymouth	3:21.36	Goolay 50	Double Trouble 51.5
1981	Gold Bullion	50.5	Sucaryl	Sterling	Lionhearted (GB)	Garry Phillips	JL Swafford & EW Symes	Noel Eales, Woodville	3:18.20 Firm	Despa 57	Disraeli 52
1980	Koiro Trelay	53	Trelay	Corrieann	Kurdistan	Phillip Smith	DG Canning	Eric Temperton, Awapuni	3:20.22	Schenley 53	Tamaryn 52
1979	Star Order	55	Final Orders	Lady Tyrone	County Tyrone	Eddie Low	JR & RK Dawson & Mrs MO McDonald	Eddie Low, Riccarton	3:24.63	Denali 51	Red Ensign 52
1978	Royal Cadenza	57	Bucaroon	Cadenza	Ayrshire Bard	Paul Hillis	BO Reed & JK Robb	Stuart Dromgool, Cambridge	3:18.80	Bahrain 54.5	Hytest 50.75
1977	Heidsieck	52	Hermes (GB)	Marise	Blue Coral	Bob Skelton	GR & Mrs Pollock	Fred Phillips, Matangi	3:19.60	Thomas Mellay 50.5	Royal Dell 53.5
1976	Andrew	50	Paracourt (Ire)	Abdication	Belvedere	David Wittington	D L & Mrs DR Ross	Lachie Ross, Hastings	3:25.60	Our Countess 51.5	Wild Irish 57.5
1975	Heidsieck	48.5	Hermes	Marise	Blue Coral	Bruce Compton	GR & Mrs Pollock	Fred Phillips, Matangi	3:23.00	Andrew 48	Our Countess 54
1974	Fury's Order	57	Indian Order (GB)	Our Fury	Le Filou (Fra)	Jim Walker	LH Bridgeman	Wally McEwan, Hawera	3:20.40	Roaming 53	Heckle’s Choice 51
1973	Watallan	50	Bellborough	Swanky	Beaumaris	Steve Allen	Wattie Latimer & J Mathieson	Brian Anderton, Wingatui	3:22.60	His Bestone 49	Pole Star 52
1972	Kartika	7.13	Fair's Fair (GB)	Queen Hestia	Precipitation (GB)	Jim Walker	C G & Mrs Taylor	Brian Deacon, Hawera	3:22.0	Golden Sam	Classico
1971	Princess Mellay	8.12	Mellay (GB)	Princess Ermine	Beaumaris	Bob Skelton	Alice Anderton	Hec Anderton, Wingatui	3:21.8	Trelay	Josie Glow
1970	Princess Mellay	7.12	Mellay (GB)	Princess Ermine	Beaumaris	John Dowling	Alice Anderton	Hec Anderton, Wingatui	3:28.0	Trelay	Arrivederci

== Previous winners ==
- 1969 – Middy
- 1968 – Noir Filou
- 1967 – Laramie
- 1966 – Royal Bid
- 1965 – Fieldmaster
- 1964 – Alaska
- 1963 – Beauzami
- 1962 – Stipulate
- 1961 – Quite Able
- 1960 – Oreka
- 1959 – Foglia d'Oro
- 1958 – Balfast
- 1957 – Great Scot
- 1956 – Jimmy Flash
- 1955 – Poetical
- 1954 – Dormant
- 1953 – Gold Scheme
- 1952 – Conclusion
- 1951 – Jamell
- 1950 – Calibrate
- 1949 – Excellency
- 1948 – Sir Garnish
- 1947 – Beau Le Havre
- 1946 – Catterick Bridge
- 1945 – Golden Souvenir
- 1944 – Kevin
- 1943 – Classform
- 1942 – Royal Lancer
- 1941 – Happy Ending
- 1940 – Serenata
- 1939 – Yours Truly
- 1938 – Arctic King
- 1937 – Cerne Abbas
- 1936 – Ferson (AUS)
- 1935 – Cuddle
- 1934 – Steeton
- 1933 – Palantua
- 1932 – Fast Passage
- 1931 – Spearful
- 1930 – Nightmarch
- 1929 – Chide
- 1928 – Oratrix
- 1927 – Rapier
- 1926 – Count Cavour
- 1925 – The Banker
- 1924 – Sunart
- 1923 – Rouen
- 1922 – Scion
- 1921 – Royal Star
- 1920 – Oratress
- 1919 – Vagabond
- 1918 – Sasanof
- 1917 – Menelaus
- 1916 – Ardenvhor
- 1915 – Tangihau
- 1914 – Inigo
- 1914 – Warstep
- 1913 – Sinapis
- 1912 – Midnight Sun
- 1911 – Vice Admiral
- 1910 – Bridge
- 1909 – Lady Lucy
- 1908 – Downfall
- 1907 – Frisco
- 1906 – Star Rose
- 1905 – Noctuiform
- 1904 – Grand Rapids
- 1903 – Canteen
- 1902 – Halberdier
- 1901 – Tortulla
- 1900 – Fulmen
- 1900 – Ideal
- 1899 – Seahorse
- 1898 – Tirant d'Eau
- 1897 – Waiuku
- 1896 – Lady Zetland
- 1895 – Euroclydon
- 1894 – Impulse
- 1893 – Rosefeldt
- 1892 – St. Hippo
- 1891 – British Lion
- 1890 – Wolverine
- 1889 – Tirailleur
- 1888 – Manton
- 1887 – Lochiel
- 1886 – Spade Guinea
- 1885 – Fusilade
- 1884 – Vanguard
- 1883 – Tasman (AUS)
- 1882 – Welcome Jack
- 1881 – Grip
- 1880 – Le Loup
- 1879 – Chancellor
- 1878 – Maritana
- 1877 – Mata
- 1876 – Guy Fawkes
- 1875 – Nectar
- 1874 – Tambourini
- 1873 – Kakapo
- 1872 – Detractor
- 1871 – Peeress
- 1870 – Knottingley (Dec)
- 1870 – Knottingley (Jan)
- 1869 – Mainsail
- 1868 – Flying Jib
- 1867 – Magenta
- 1866 – Nourmahal
- 1865 – Rob Roy

== See also ==
- Recent winners of major NZ cups
- Wellington Cup
- Auckland Cup
