= Ellerslie Racecourse =

Racecourse in Auckland, New Zealand

Coordinates: 36°53′21.45″S 174°48′20.77″E

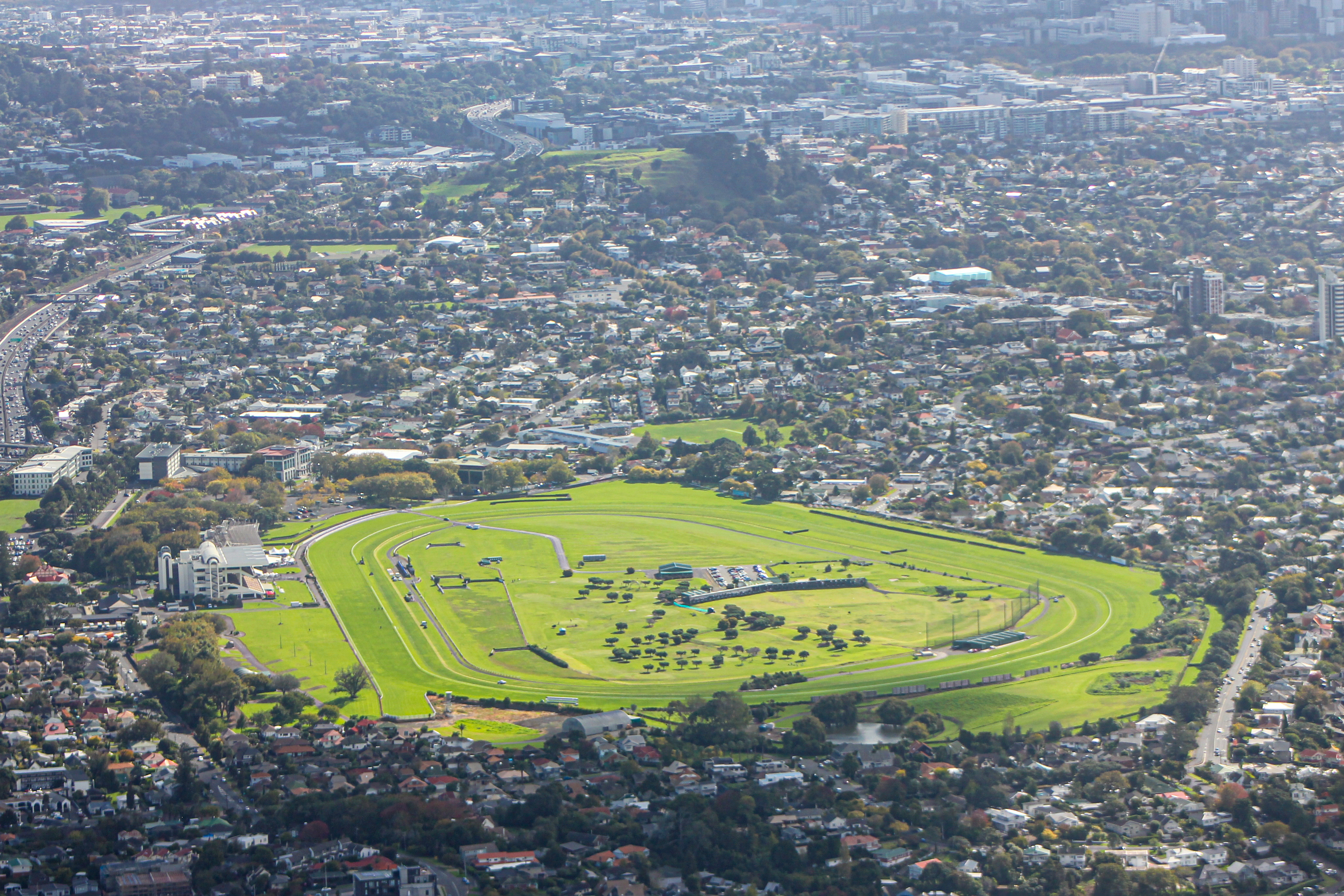
Aerial view of the Ellerslie Racecourse

Ellerslie Racecourse is the main racecourse in Auckland, New Zealand, for thoroughbred racehorses. It is an undulating, grass circuit in the suburb of Ellerslie, with a circumference of just under 1,900 metres. Racing is conducted in a clockwise (right-handed) direction.

== History ==
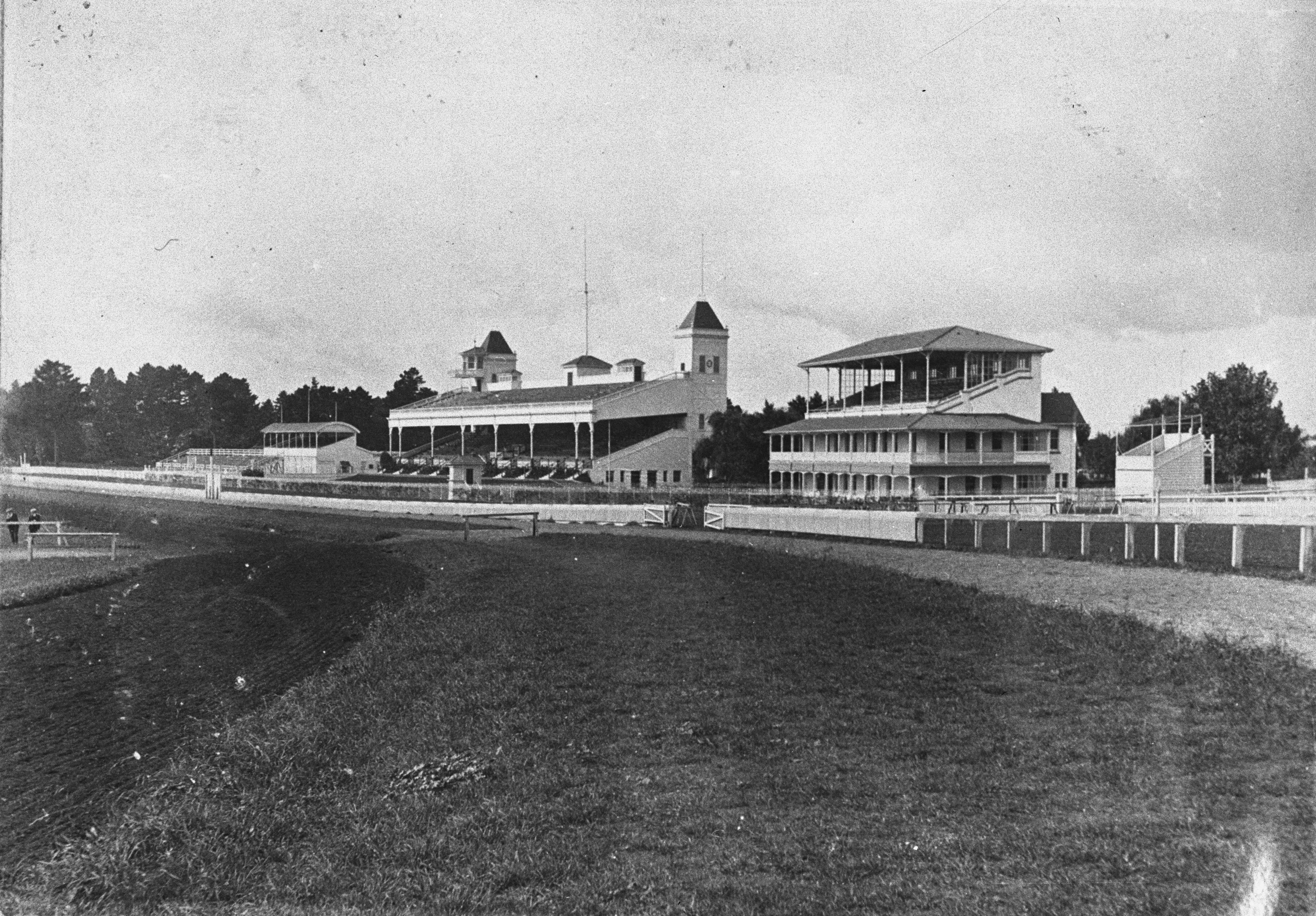
Ellerslie Racecourse circa 1910 in a photograph by Albert Percy Godber

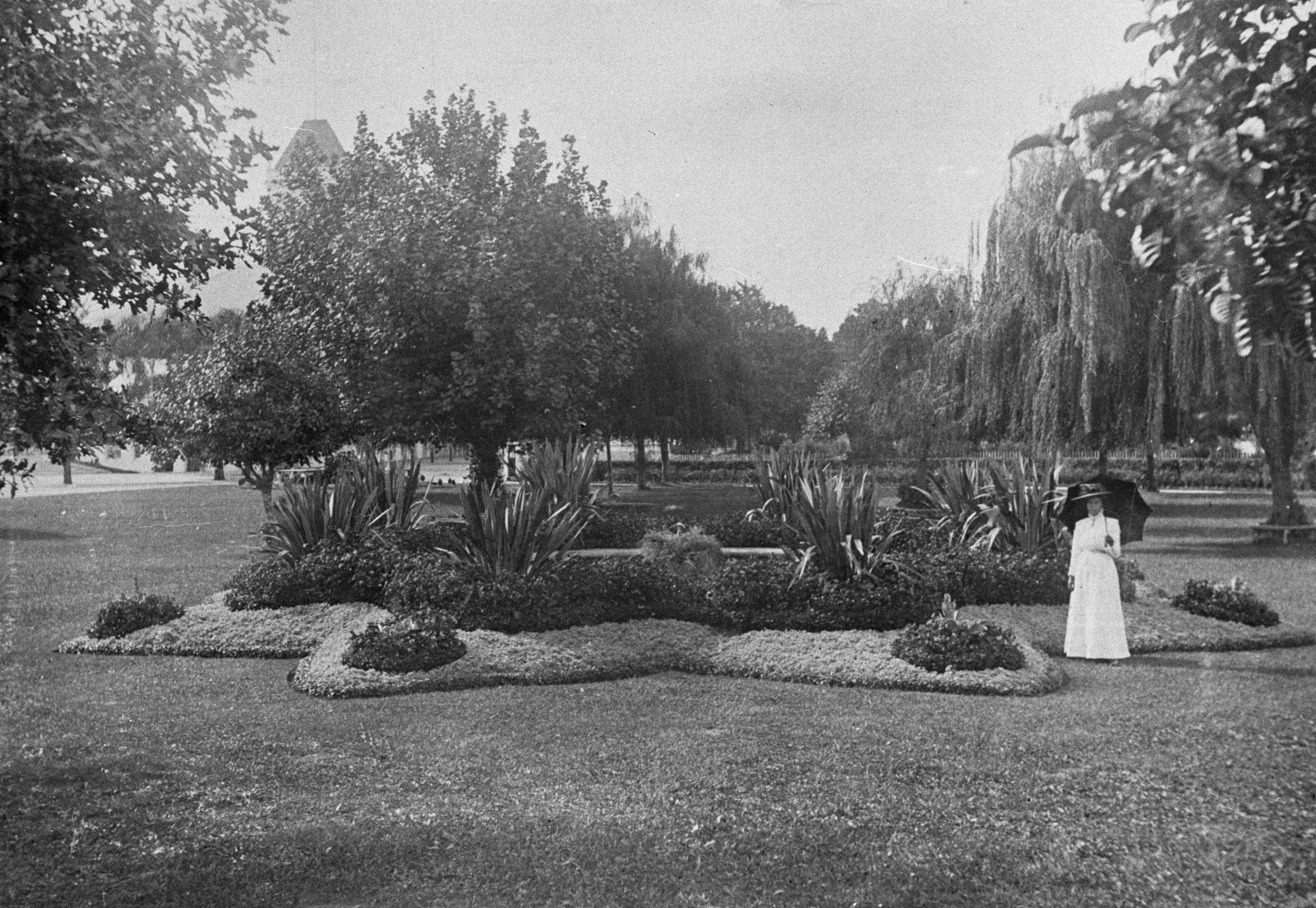
Grounds circa 1910

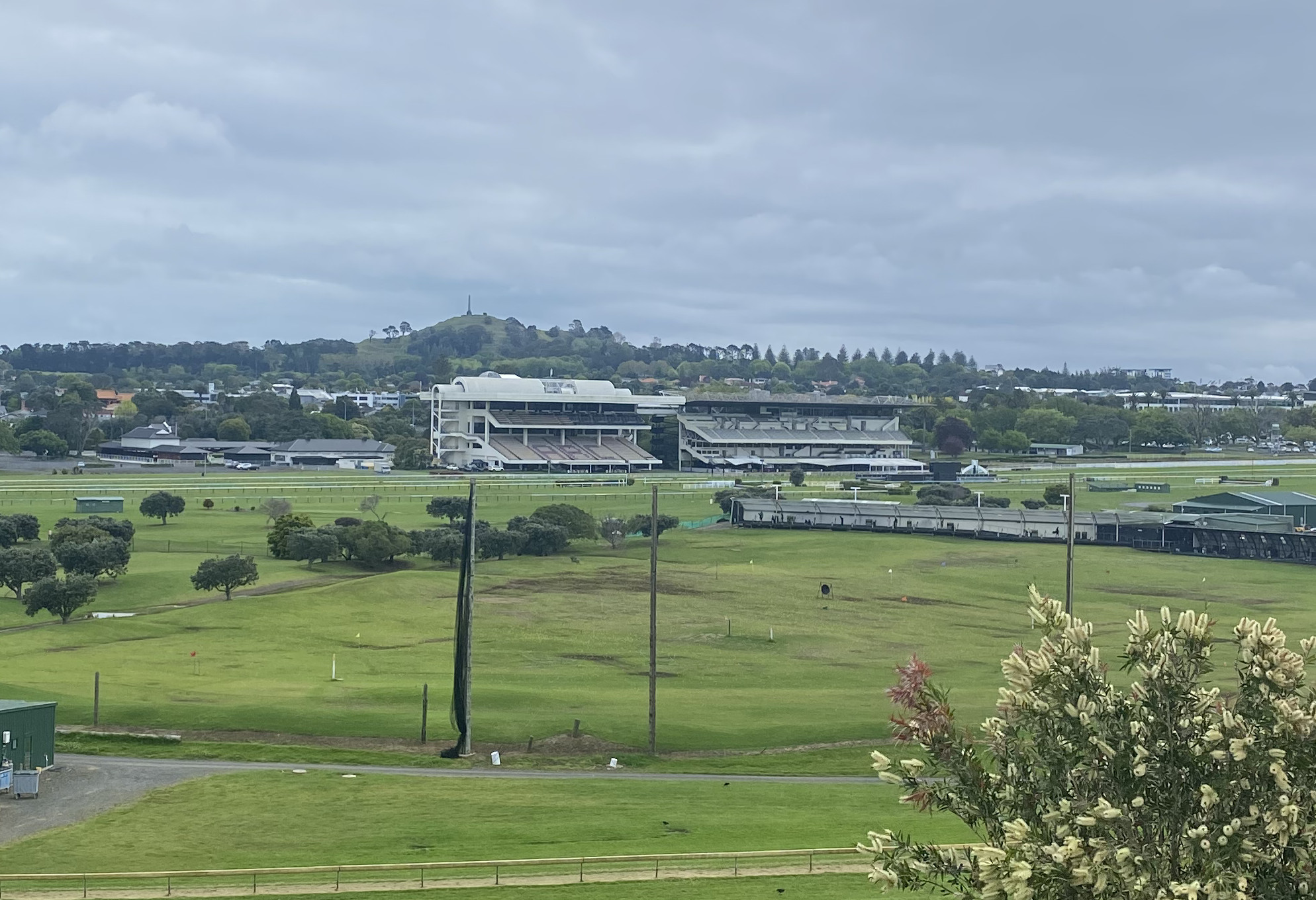
Grounds in 2021

Horses have raced at Ellerslie since 1857 when Robert Graham hosted a race meeting on his property, on the site which is now Ellerslie Racecourse. The Auckland Racing club then purchased thirty-six hectares of land from Graham in 1872 on which the course is situated.

The first race meeting of the Auckland Racing Club was held at Ellerslie on 25 May 1874. At this time the racecourse was a considerable distance outside the city and it took Aucklanders up to several hours to get to the course by carriage.

A "platform" station, Ellerslie Racecourse Platform was opened in January 1874. Many race attendees travelled by train, although with the demand created by the event, as late as in 1910 they often had to travel in open cattle trucks because there were not enough normal coaches available for the demand of the extra services.

A publication compiled by E.G. Sutherland, held in the Sir George Grey Special Collections, makes note of the importance of the aesthetic appeal of Ellerslie:

The Auckland Racing Club operates the Ellerslie Racecourse, which features landscaped grounds including floral beds, ponds, and various tree species. The venue has historically hosted numerous international visitors and high-ranking officials, contributing to its role as a significant location for thoroughbred racing in New Zealand.

Ellerslie was the location of the first automatic totalisator, designed by George Julius and installed in 1913.. Queen Elizabeth II visited the racecourse during the royal visit to New Zealand in 1953/54.

During World War Two the Stands were used as Hospital Wards for the American Forces serving in the Pacific. Dr McGregor-Grant, who the Steeplechase is named after, was the head Doctor.

During the 20th century, Ellerslie Racecourse provided plants for Kingseat Hospital.

Champion racehorses to have raced at Ellerslie include Kindergarten, Balmerino, Bonecrusher, Uncle Remus, Japan Cup winner Horlicks, Il Tempo, Mr Tiz, Sunline (who was buried at the racecourse in 2009) and Jimmy Choux.

Ellerslie is home to two of New Zealand's major racing carnivals - the Summer Carnival and Auckland Cup Week. The Summer Carnival is run in the Christmas-New Year period with Boxing Day and New Year's Day formerly being home to the New Zealand Derby and Auckland Cup respectively, but these were moved to the new Auckland Cup Week in March 2006.

== Steeplechasing ==
Steeplechasing at Ellerslie used the well-known "Ellerslie hill." The jumping track left the course proper just before the 1000 metre mark at the end of the back straight and rose approximately 16 metres to the top of the hill, where there were two steeplechase fences 100 metres apart. There was another at the foot of the hill where the steeplechase track rejoined the course proper just after the 600-metre mark. The total length of this section of the track was approximately 750 metres. It was not used for flat racing. The major steeplechase at Ellerslie, the Great Northern Steeplechase, required the horses to climb this hill 3 times in the 6400m event.

The Great Northern Steeplechase and Great Northern Hurdles are no longer held at Ellerslie after the Auckland Racing Club sold land for housing development. From 2022 the races have been held at Te Rapa.

== Races ==
The following is a list of Group races which are run at Ellerslie Racecourse.

Grp	Race Name	Age	Sex	Weight	Distance	Date
1	Proisir Plate	Open	Open	wfa	1400	September
1	Zabeel Classic	Open	Open	wfa	2000	26 December
1	Railway Stakes	Open	Open	wfa	1200	January
R	Karaka Million	Restricted 2yo	Open	sw	1200	January
1	New Zealand Derby	3YO	Open	sw	2400	March
1	Auckland Cup	Open	Open	hcp	3200	March
1	Ellerslie Sires Produce Stakes	2YO	Open	sw	1200	March
1	New Zealand Stakes	Open	Open	wfa	2000	March
2	Easter Handicap	Open	Open	hcp	1600	April
2	Eight Carat Classic	3YO	Fillies	sw	1600	December
2	Great Northern Guineas	3YO	Open	sw	1600	January
2	Royal Stakes	3YO	Fillies	sw	2000	January
2	City of Auckland Cup	Open	Open	hcp	2400	January
2	Rich Hill Mile	Open	Open	hcp	1600	January
2	Championship Stakes	3YO	Open	sw	2100	April
2	Darley Plate	Open	Open	wfa	1200	March
3	Lindauer Stakes	Open	Open	wfa	2000	November
3	Great Northern Challenge Stakes	Open	Open	wfa	1600	November
3	Eclipse Stakes	2YO	Open	sw	1200	January

Other races of note in the past include:

- Great Northern Foal Stakes, currently a listed race known as the Auckland Futurity Stakes.
- DB Draught Classic.
- Great Northern St. Leger.

== See also ==
- Thoroughbred racing in New Zealand
- Trentham Racecourse
