= Wilkes (horse) =

French-bred Thoroughbred racehorse

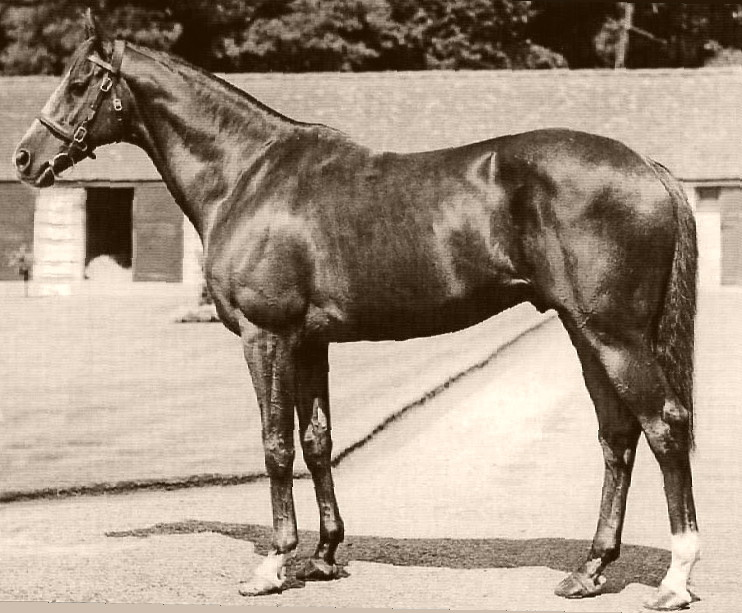
- Court Martial, the sire of Wilkes
- Sire: Court Martial (GB)
- Grandsire: Fair Trial
- Dam: Sans Tares (GB)
- Damsire: Sind (GB)
- Sex: Stallion
- Foaled: 1952
- Country: France
- Colour: Chestnut
- Owner: John Kelly
- Record: 3: 2-?-?
- Earnings: 1,446,200 francs ($2,780)

Major wins
- 1955 Prix Edgard de la Charm; 1955 Prix Sans Souci

Awards
- Leading sire in Australia (1963, 1964, 1969)
- Last updated on 19 July 2011

Wilkes was a French Thoroughbred racehorse who became a leading sire in Australia. He had two victories, over 1,500 metres in the Prix Sans Souci at Maisons-Laffitte and the 2,000 metres Prix Edgard de la Charm at Saint-Cloud, for 1,446,200 francs (equivalent of A$2,780) in stakes.

== Breeding ==
He was by the successful English sire Court Martial, his dam Sans Tares (GB) was by Sind from Tara (FR) by Teddy. Wilkes was a half-brother to two Washington, D.C. International Stakes winners in Mahan and Worden II who was also a good sire. Sans Tares was a half-sister to Norseman, a stakes-winner and sire of stakes-winners. Like Northern Dancer, Wilkes was a great-great-grandson in the sire-line of Phalaris.

Wilkes was a tall, long-barrelled chestnut with a prominent white blaze and one white sock that was said to resemble that of his sire Court Martial and his paternal grandsire Fair Trial.

Wilkes did not start as a two-year-old, but had two wins, in the Prix Sans Souci and the Prix Edgard de la Charm (1,027,000 francs) at Saint-Cloud, for a total of 1,446,200 francs (equivalent of A$2,780) in stakes as a three-year-old from three race starts.

== Stud record ==
John William Kelly purchased Wilkes for £5,000 sterling in 1956 and imported him to stand at his Newhaven Park Stud, Boorowa, New South Wales in Australia. Wilkes commenced stud duties here in 1956 and was an immediate sire success from first foal crop, which produced nine winners including the champion mare Wenona Girl (won 22 principal races, 15 of which were later designated group one (G1) races.). He also sired three winners of the Golden Slipper Stakes, Vain (1969), John's Hope (1972) and Vivarchi (1976).

His progeny included 45 stakeswinners for 121 stakeswins, including the following:

- Attentive (AJC Gimcrack Stakes, VATC Debutante Stakes)
- Anjudy (1972 AJC Champagne Stakes),
- Blue Roc (1966 Queensland Oaks),
- Bogan Road (1962 AJC Sires' Produce Stakes, AJC Champagne Stakes),
- Bye Bye (1969 AJC Doncaster Handicap),
- Emblem (1961 VRC Sires' Produce Stakes),
- Farnworth (1964 AJC Champagne Stakes)
- John's Hope (1972 STC Golden Slipper Stakes, VATC Blue Diamond Stakes),
- Mansingh, won 1974 New Zealand Derby
- Nebo Road (1967 VRC Newmarket Handicap in 1 min. 9.3 sec.),
- Pardon Me (1964 VATC Oakleigh Plate),
- Skyjack (1974 VRC George Adams Handicap, VRC Sires' Produce Stakes),
- The Tempest (1964 BATC Doomben Ten Thousand),
- Vain, an exceptional sprinter in Australia, winning 12 of his 14 starts and the leading sire in Australia in 1984.
- Vivarchi (foaled when Wilkes was 22 years old, and winner Golden Slipper Stakes and AJC Champagne Stakes in race-record time of 1 min. 35.2 sec. for 1,600 metres),
- Young Brolga (1961 AJC Sires' Produce Stakes in permanent race-record time of 1 min. 22.8 sec. for seven furlongs).

Wilkes was humanely destroyed at the age of 24 years on 20 May 1976 after developing a bladder infection. A 21st season of 18 specially selected mares had been nominated at a fee of $6,000 with a live foal guarantee.

== See also ==
- List of leading Thoroughbred racehorses
