= Court Martial (horse) =

British thoroughbred racehorse

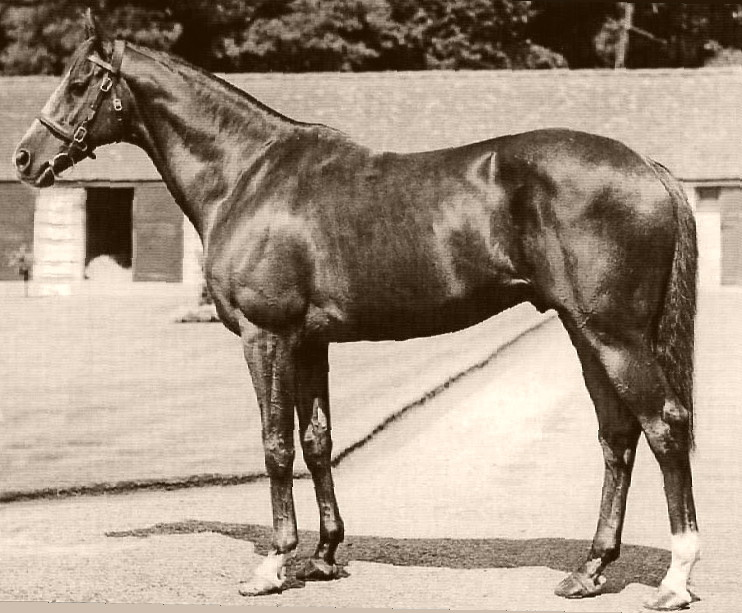
- Sire: Fair Trial
- Grandsire: Fairway
- Dam: Instantaneous
- Damsire: Hurry On
- Sex: Stallion
- Foaled: 1942
- Country: Great Britain
- Colour: Chestnut
- Breeder: Lord Astor
- Owner: Lord Astor
- Trainer: Joseph Lawson
- Record: 8: 6–1–1
- Earnings: £11,666½

Major wins
- 2000 Guineas Stakes (1945); Champion Stakes (1945)

Awards
- Leading sire in Great Britain and Ireland (1956, 1957)
- Last updated on 23 October 2011

Court Martial (foaled 1942 in England – died in 1974) was a Thoroughbred racehorse bred and raced by Lord Astor best known for defeating two exceptional colts in Dante and Royal Charger for the Classic 2000 Guineas Stakes and as a two-time leading sire in Great Britain and Ireland.

He was a chestnut horse sired by the leading sire Fair Trial, that also sired Petition (won the Eclipse Stakes). Court Martial's dam Instantaneous by Hurry On was the dam of several other named foals, but none was a stakes winner. She was a great granddaughter of Astor's foundation mare Conjure. John Hislop describes Court Martial as "A beautiful horse of superb quality, truly made, sound and possessed of excellent limbs, but with shelly feet a trait which he has handed on ... Though having a measure of stamina, speed was Court Martial's forte, which is reflected in his stock. An outstanding and wonderfully consistent stallion . . . his mares have done comparably well at stud. Most of his stock likes soft ground."

== Racing record ==
Court Martial was undefeated in his two starts as a two-year-old. At three, he won the 2000 Guineas Stakes and the Champion Stakes and was third in The Derby, where he finished two lengths and a head away third to Dante and Midas in a field of 27 runners in the time of 2 min 26.6 sec.

== Stud record ==
Court Martial's grave at Claiborne Farm

Court Martial was a prolific sire of winners, being the leading sire twice and was a six-time leading sire of two-year-olds.

Notable progeny include:

- Above Suspicion (IRE), won St. James's Palace Stakes
- Affreux (FR), won GB Dickens Plate and Bestwood Park Plate, sire of winners of over $1,200,000 in Australia
- Court Sentence, won St James's Palace Stakes; sire in Australia
- Grass Court (Cork and Orrery Stakes)
- High Treason (IRE) – won Nunthorpe Stakes
- King's Bench (Middle Park Stakes, Coventry Stakes etc.
- Major Portion (IRE) won Queen Elizabeth II Stakes, Sussex Stakes etc.
- Marsolve won July Cup
- Pheidippides won Gimcrack Stakes
- Ratification won Coventry Stakes
- Rosalba won Coronation Stakes and Queen Elizabeth II Stakes
- Timandra (FR) won French One Thousand Guineas
- Wilkes (FR) won Prix Sans Souci and Prix Edgard de la Charm; leading sire in Australia.

About 25 of Court Martial's sons have been imported to Australia and New Zealand since 1954 and have sired the collective winners of almost $8 million in prize money.

Court Martial died of infirmities of old age. He was 32.
