= Sir Tristram =

Irish-bred Thoroughbred racehorse

- Sire: Sir Ivor
- Grandsire: Sir Gaylord
- Dam: Isolt
- Damsire: Round Table
- Sex: Stallion
- Foaled: 7 April 1971
- Died: 21 May 1997 (aged 26)
- Country: Ireland
- Colour: Bay
- Breeder: not found
- Owner: 1) Raymond R. Guest; 2) Sir Patrick Hogan (at stud)
- Trainer: 1) Clive Brittain; 2) Charles G. Milbank (USA)
- Record: 19: 2–6–3
- Earnings: ₣238,465

Major wins
- Prix de Saint-Pierre Azif; Prix de Tire Gerbe

Awards
- 1984–87, 1988–90 Leading sire in Australia; Leading Broodmare Sire in Australia; 1986/7 Leading Sire of New Zealand

Honours
- New Zealand Racing Hall of Fame (2008)
- Last updated on 22 October 2011

Sir Tristram (7 April 1971 – 21 May 1997) was an Irish-bred Thoroughbred racehorse who stood at stud in New Zealand, where he sired an extraordinary 45 Group One winners, including three Melbourne Cup winners. His progeny earned him 17 official Leading Australasian sire premierships, plus nine broodmare sire titles.

== Background ==
Sir Tristram's sire was Sir Ivor (by Sir Gaylord) out of Isolt (by Round Table), and had 19 starts for two wins in France.

== Racing career ==
Trained by Charles Milbank and raced in Ireland, England and France, owner Raymond Guest sent Sir Tristram to Churchill Downs in Louisville, Kentucky to compete in the 1974 Kentucky Derby. Under jockey Bill Hartack, the colt finished eleventh.

== Stud record ==
Following his racing career, he was purchased by Sir Patrick Hogan of Cambridge Stud in New Zealand, and entered stud in 1976 at the modest stud fee of $1,200. By the time of his death in August 1997, his fee had risen to $200,000. 'Paddy', as he was affectionately known, had a reputation as a difficult horse to handle, although this is not a trait which seems to have been inherited by his progeny. In fact, he was so difficult that his handler was forced to wear protective gear, which remains on display at Cambridge Stud. Sir Tristram is the sire of over 140 stakes winners, including the Melbourne Cup winners Gurner's Lane (1982), Empire Rose (1988), and Brew (2000). He is also the broodmare sire of over 200 stakes winners, including the Melbourne Cup winners Saintly and Ethereal, and has earned himself a reputation as a sire of sires. His sire sons include Zabeel (who stood at Cambridge Stud at a fee of NZD$100,000), Marauding, Dr Grace and Grosvenor.

Whilst he was known as a sire of stayers, Sir Tristram's progeny and further descendants have won races over a wide range of distances. As well as siring winners of the Melbourne Cup (a handicap over 3,200 metres), Sir Tristram sired Marauding, who won a Golden Slipper (a two-year-old race over 1,200 metres), and several other two-year-olds. During 1984 to 1987 and 1988 to 1990 he was the Leading sire in Australia, Leading Broodmare Sire in Australia and in 1986/7 the Leading Sire of New Zealand.

Sir Tristram was humanely euthanized on 21 May 1997 after he broke his shoulder and he was buried standing up – 'A priest conducted a 40-minute service for the horse they called "Paddy"'.

In 2008, Sir Tristram was inducted in the New Zealand Racing Hall of Fame.

=== Progeny ===
Sir Tristram's 45 Group 1 winners:

| Horse | Race |
|---|---|
| Admiral Lincoln | 1984 Australian Cup |
| Brew | 2000 Melbourne Cup |
| Cure | 1986 New Zealand 1000 Guineas |
| Dalmacia | 1982 Epsom Handicap; 1983 Rawson Stakes |
| Dr Grace | 1990 Chipping Norton Stakes; 1990 Australian Derby; 1991 The BMW Stakes; 1991 Underwood Stakes |
| Dupain | 1996 Brisbane Cup |
| Empire Rose | 1988 Mackinnon Stakes; 1988 Melbourne Cup |
| Fair Sir | 1987 The Australasian |
| Glastonbury | 1994 The Metropolitan |
| Grosvenor | 1982 Caulfield Guineas; 1982 Sires Produce Stakes; 1982 Victoria Derby |
| Gurner's Lane | 1982 Caulfield Cup; 1982 Melbourne Cup |
| Irish Chance | 1999 Auckland Cup |
| Isolda | 1995 Champagne Stakes |
| Kaapstad | 1987 Sires Produce Stakes |
| Limitless | 1987 Brisbane Cup |
| Lurestina | 1992 Auckland Classic |
| Mahaya | 1993 AJC Oaks |
| Mapperley Heights | 1984 South Australian Derby |
| Marauding | 1987 Golden Slipper |
| Military Plume | 1986 Rothwells Stakes; 1987 Australasian Guineas |
| National Gallery | 1984 Western Australian Derby |
| Noble Heights | 1981 New Zealand 1000 Guineas |
| Noble Peer | 1985 Australian Cup |
| Only A Lady | 1997 Flight Stakes |
| Our Tristalight | 1993 Australasian Oaks; 1993 South Australian Oaks |
| Popsy | 1993 New Zealand Derby; 1993 Championship Stakes |
| Pride of Rosewood | 1983 Gamely Stakes |
| Queen's Road | 1982 Brisbane Cup |
| Riverina Charm | 1988 VATC One Thousand Guineas; 1989 Canterbury Guineas; 1989 Rosehill Guineas; 1990 Air New Zealand Stakes |
| Royal Heights | 1986 New Zealand Oaks |
| Sir Vigilant | 1985 New Zealand St. Leger |
| Sovereign Red | 1980 Caulfield Guineas; 1980 Victoria Derby; 1980 Western Mail Classic; 1981 Rothmans 100,000; 1980 WATC Australian Derby; 1981 Underwood Stakes |
| Starline | 1987 New Zealand Oaks |
| Tasman | 1980 South Australian Derby |
| Trichelle | 1985 Marlboro Cup |
| Trissaring | 1987 TV NZ-WFA |
| Trissaro | 1983 Tancred Stakes; 1983 Underwood Stakes; 1984 Sydney Cup |
| Tristalove | 1993 AJC Sires' Produce Stakes; 1994 Australasian Oaks |
| Tristanagh | 1989 VRC Oaks; 1989 VATC One Thousand Guineas |
| Tristarc | 1985 Underwood Stakes; 1985 Caulfield Stakes; 1985 Caulfield Cup; 1985 AJC Derby; 1986 Queen Elizabeth Stakes |
| Tristina | 1985 Queensland Derby |
| Tristram Rose | 1985 Queensland Oaks |
| Tristram's Belle | 1985 VRC Oaks |
| Tristram's Edition | 1985 Castlemaine Stakes |
| Zabeel | 1990 Australasian Guineas |

== Pedigree ==
Pedigree of Sir Tristram (Ire), bay stallion, 1971
| Sire Sir Ivor (USA) 1965 | Sir Gaylord (USA); 1959 | Turn-To (USA); 1951 | Royal Charger (GB) |
| Sire Sir Ivor (USA) 1965 | Sir Gaylord (USA); 1959 | Turn-To (USA); 1951 | Source Sucree (Fr) |
| Sire Sir Ivor (USA) 1965 | Sir Gaylord (USA); 1959 | Somethingroyal (USA); 1952 | Princequillo (Ire) |
| Sire Sir Ivor (USA) 1965 | Sir Gaylord (USA); 1959 | Somethingroyal (USA); 1952 | Imperatrice (USA) |
| Sire Sir Ivor (USA) 1965 | Attica (USA); 1953 | Mr.Trouble (USA); 1947 | Mahmoud (Fr) |
| Sire Sir Ivor (USA) 1965 | Attica (USA); 1953 | Mr.Trouble (USA); 1947 | Motto (USA) |
| Sire Sir Ivor (USA) 1965 | Attica (USA); 1953 | Athenia (USA); 1943 | Pharamond (GB) |
| Sire Sir Ivor (USA) 1965 | Attica (USA); 1953 | Athenia (USA); 1943 | Salaminia (USA) |
| Dam Isolt (USA) 1961 | Round Table (USA); 1954 | Princequillo (Ire); 1940 | Prince Rose (GB) |
| Dam Isolt (USA) 1961 | Round Table (USA); 1954 | Princequillo (Ire); 1940 | Cosquilla (GB) |
| Dam Isolt (USA) 1961 | Round Table (USA); 1954 | Knight's Daughter (GB); 1941 | Sir Cosmo (Ire) |
| Dam Isolt (USA) 1961 | Round Table (USA); 1954 | Knight's Daughter (GB); 1941 | Feola (GB) |
| Dam Isolt (USA) 1961 | All My Eye (GB); 1954 | My Babu (Fr); 1945 | Djebel (Fr) |
| Dam Isolt (USA) 1961 | All My Eye (GB); 1954 | My Babu (Fr); 1945 | Perfume (GB) |
| Dam Isolt (USA) 1961 | All My Eye (GB); 1954 | All Moonshine (GB); 1941 | Bobsleigh (GB) |
| Dam Isolt (USA) 1961 | All My Eye (GB); 1954 | All Moonshine (GB); 1941 | Selene (GB) (Family: 6-e) |
