= Newfoundland pony =

Breed of horse

Newfoundland Pony
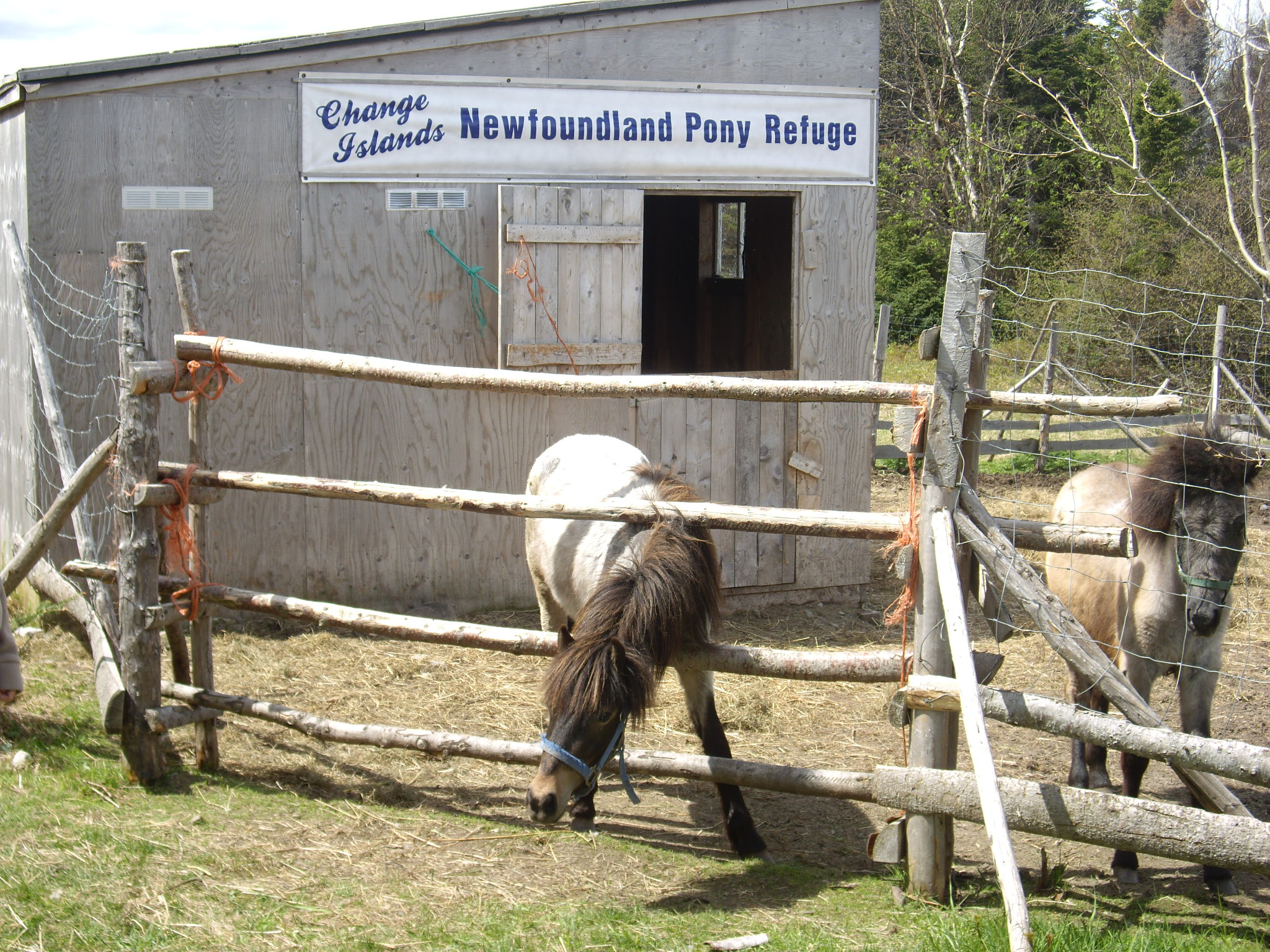
- Newfoundlands in Change Islands
- Country of origin: Canada (Newfoundland)

Traits
- Distinguishing features: Sturdy, hardy island pony

Breed standards
- Newfoundland Pony Society

The Newfoundland pony is a breed of pony originating in Newfoundland, Canada. They are sturdy and muscular ponies, found in many colors. The Newfoundland developed from a mix of English, Irish, and Scottish pony breeds brought to Newfoundland by settlers over a period of four centuries. Initially free-roaming, they crossbred to produce the modern type. They were used by settlers as draft and multi-purpose ponies until the mid-20th century, when they were brought almost to the point of extinction by mechanization and slaughter. The population rebounded slightly after the formation of a breed registry in 1980, but still remains low. In 1997, the Newfoundland pony was declared a heritage breed of Newfoundland and Labrador, which afforded it protection under the law, but the breed has not yet been recognized under the Canadian federal Animal Pedigree Act. As of 2008, there were 248 registered ponies of breeding age, out of a total population of 361. In 2013, the widely dispersed breeding population is still estimated at between 200 and 250 animals.

== Characteristics ==
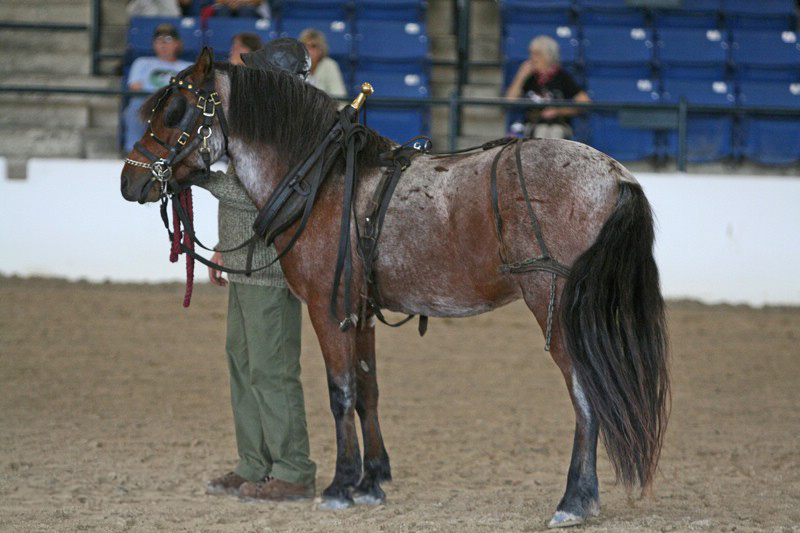
A pony in driving tack

Newfoundland ponies are usually 11 to 14.2 hands (44 to 58 inches, 112 to 147 cm) tall and weight 400 to 800 pounds (180 to 360 kg). They are often black, bay or brown in color. Roan, chestnut, gray and dun are also seen. White coloration is occasionally found in the breed, though white in horses is very rare. Gray horses, whose hair coats become white as they age, are much more common. Grays are born dark colored with dark skin and lighten in color as they age, retaining the dark skin. White horses are born and remain white in color, and have pink skin. Pinto color patterns are not eligible for registration. White markings are minimal, and seasonal color changes are often drastic.

The head is small, with thickly-furred ears that are small and quite pointed at the tips. Overall, the body is stocky and muscular, with a deep, narrow chest, short back, sloping croup and low-set tail. The coat and mane are thick, especially in winter. To be registered with the Newfoundland Pony Society, ponies must "[have] a good temperament and [be] docile and easy to work with." They are generally used as family horses for pleasure riding and driving, although they are also seen at horse shows.

== Breed history ==
The ancestors of the Newfoundland pony arrived in Newfoundland from the British Isles, brought there by settlers between 1611 and the mid-1900s. Dartmoor ponies formed the initial shipment, imported by John Guy, the first proprietary governor of Newfoundland. Lord Falkland imported additional animals soon after, and these were followed by a spate of pony shipments from England, Ireland and Scotland. Additional breeds found in the shipments included the now-extinct Galloway pony, as well as Connemara, Dartmoor, Exmoor, Fell, Highland and New Forest ponies. Beginning with the first imports, the breeds crossbred, eventually forming the modern Newfoundland pony.

In the past the Newfoundland pony was used for ploughing, assisting with gardens, hauling kelp from the beaches, gathering hay, and carrying wood, and they were also used for transportation. They were successfully used and bred to withstand the hard climate, and by 1935 there were over 9,000 ponies on the island. During the mid-20th century, however, increasing mechanization and a ban on free-roaming ponies contributed to a decline in the population, and increased exports to France for horse meat in the 1970s almost led to the extinction of the breed.

Shortly before the breed became extinct, several interested breeders came together and formed the Newfoundland Pony Society in 1980. The group was formed to gather the remaining free-roaming herds, register the horses and breed them in captivity, and was successful in locating around 300 animals. In 1997 the Government of Newfoundland and Labrador passed the Heritage Animals Act, which made the Newfoundland pony the first (and, so far, only) heritage animal of Newfoundland and Labrador. A subsequent order designated the Newfoundland Pony Society as "the group which will maintain the registry of ponies and otherwise act for the preservation of the animal." In part, this Act required anyone wishing to export ponies from Newfoundland to first acquire a permit; this ensured that ponies were going to private homes instead of slaughterhouses. Also in 1997, the Newfoundland Pony Breed Association was formed. This group sought to have the Newfoundland pony recognized under the Canadian Animal Pedigree Act, which may have given it additional protection and recognition. In March 2014 the Newfoundland Pony Society stated that they believed the breed should not have federal recognition, believing that the "federal act is meant for farm stock and breeding animals", not heritage breeds. Members of the society also fear that protection of the breed may be lessened under federal law when compared with current provincial regulations. However, the provincial government will make the final decision on whether to move forward with the process for federal recognition.

In a study of mitochondrial DNA published in 2012, the Newfoundland pony and Canadian horse were found to be the most genetically diverse of the Canadian breeds studied, which also included the Sable Island horse and the Lac La Croix pony. When an estimation was made using microsatellite loci, the Newfoundland was found to have high autosomal diversity and a high number of haplotypes, some of which overlapped with the mountain and moorland pony breeds (historically documented as the ancestors of the Newfoundland), Nordic breeds and a feral population at Saint-Pierre et Miquelon. Overlapping haplotypes also suggested a relationship with the Standardbred and Clydesdale, suggesting possible crossbreeding at some point, although previous studies using microsatellite markers had not come to this conclusion. Although the microsatellite loci showed a relationship between the Newfoundland and the Sable Island horse, the study did not find overlapping haplotypes that would support this, possibly due to the population bottleneck in the 1980s that may have resulted in such haplotypes being lost. To be registered with the Newfoundland Pony Society, ponies must undergo DNA testing to verify Newfoundland parentage.

In 2011 The Livestock Conservancy (TLC) added the Newfoundland pony to their Conservation Priority List in the "study" category, as it worked to verify the breed's history and population numbers. In 2012, with studies completed, the breed was moved to the "critical" category, meaning that the breed has a global population of less than 2,000 and annual registrations in the US of less than 200. Rare Breeds Canada also considers the breed critically endangered, with fewer than 15 annual registrations of purebred female breeding stock. As of 2008, there were 248 registered ponies of breeding age, out of a total registered population of 361 ponies. The largest populations were in the provinces of Newfoundland and Labrador and Ontario, with smaller populations in seven other Canadian provinces and the United States. As of 2013, TLC estimates that the widely dispersed breeding population consists of between 200 and 250 ponies.
