= Canadian horse =

Canadian breed of horse

Canadian Horse
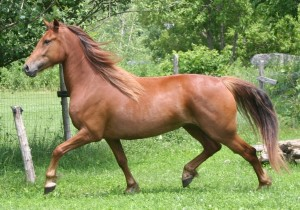
- Other names: French Canadian Horse
- Country of origin: Canada

Breed standards
- Canadian Horse Breeders Association

The Canadian (French: cheval canadien) is a horse breed from Canada. It is a strong, well-muscled horse, usually dark in colour. It is generally used for riding and driving. Descended from draft and light riding horses imported to Canada in the late 1600s from France, it was later crossed with other British and American breeds. During the 18th century the Canadian horse spread throughout the northeastern US, where it contributed to the development of several horse breeds. During the peak popularity of the breed, three subtypes could be distinguished, a draft horse type, a trotting type and a pacing type. Thousands of horses were exported in the 19th century, many of whom were subsequently killed while acting as cavalry horses in the American Civil War. These exports decreased the purebred Canadian population almost to the point of extinction, prompting the formation of a studbook and the passage of a law against further export.

Experimental breeding programs in the early 20th century succeeded in re-establishing the breed to some extent, but mechanization, combined with two world wars, again resulted in the breed almost becoming extinct. In the 1980s, concerned with the declining population numbers, interested breeders undertook a promotional program, which resulted in renewed interest in the breed. By the 1990s, population numbers were higher, and genetic studies in 1998 and 2012 found relatively high levels of genetic diversity for a small breed. However, livestock conservation organizations still consider the breed to be at risk, due to low population numbers.

== Breed characteristics ==
Most Canadian Horses are dark coloured: black, bay, or brown. A few chestnuts are found, occasionally with flaxen manes and tails, and the cream gene appears in the breed as the result of the genetic influence of one stallion. While some sources state that the gene for grey is no longer found in the breed, after the genetic bottleneck of the late 20th century, the preservation society for the breed states that they can be "rarely grey". Their height averages 14 to 16.2 hands (56 to 66 inches, 142 to 168 cm) and stallions average 1,050 to 1,350 pounds (480 to 610 kg) in weight, while mares weigh 1,000 to 1,250 pounds (450 to 570 kg).

The Canadian horse has a rather short, high-set head with a broad forehead. The neck is arched and graceful, and the chest, back and loins broad and strongly muscled. The shoulders and croup are sloping, with a relatively high-set tail. Overall, the breed gives the impression of strength and agility. Their heavy and wavy mane and tail, arched necks and finely boned heads are all reminiscent of Andalusian and Barb ancestry. Their trot is described as flashy. They are hardy horses and easy keepers. Today, most Canadian horses are used as riding and driving horses, and are known for their jumping ability. They are seen in competition in almost every discipline, as well as for leisure riding. They can also be found in light draft work, trail riding, and working as a stock horse.

As in many other breeds, there is a set naming system that is used to identify individuals based on the registration format employed by the Canadian Livestock Records Corporation. First comes the prefix, the farm or breeding establishment of which the foal was born into, followed by the sire's name, and lastly the given name for the foal. Each year a different letter is assigned to begin the given name for the foal, and it is by the year's letter that the foal is named. Some older horses do not fall under this naming strategy, but it is now mandatory in naming registered offspring coming from purebred Canadian lines. Originally, horses were tattooed with identification numbers, but now microchipping is the identification technology chosen by the breed registry.

== History ==
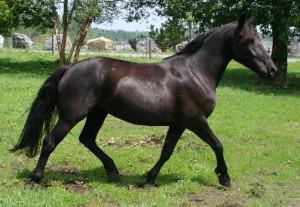
A Canadian Horse

The Canadian Horse descended from the French stock which Louis XIV sent to Canada in the late 17th century. The initial shipment, in 1665, consisted of two stallions and twenty mares from the Royal Stables in Normandy and Brittany, the centre of French horse breeding. Only 12 of the 20 mares survived the trip. Two more shipments followed, one in 1667 of 14 horses (mostly mares, but with at least one stallion), and one in 1670 of 11 mares and a stallion. The shipments included a mix of draft horses and light horses, the latter of which included both pacing and trotting horses. The exact origins of all the horses are unknown, although the shipments probably included Bretons, Normans, Arabians, Andalusians and Barbs.

The horses were leased to gentleman farmers or religious orders for money or in exchange for a foal, and they remained the property of the king for three years. Despite poor conditions and hard work, the horses thrived in Canada, and were given nicknames that included "the little iron horse" and "the horse of steel". Population numbers rose quickly from the early stock, with 148 horses by 1679, 218 horses by 1688, 684 by 1698, and by 1709, enough that the government limited farmers to owning two horses and a foal, with additional horses to be slaughtered, although this law was a failure in terms of enforcement. During the 1700s, the "French Canadian Horse" spread through what is now eastern Michigan and Illinois in the United States, and lived a generally feral existence, with many escaping human control completely. In 1798, a horse with characteristics similar to the Canadian is reported to have appeared spontaneously in Massachusetts and given to one Justin Morgan, giving rise to the Morgan breed. But this specimen may have actually been born 7 miles from the Canadian Border in Vermont, which has always fed suspicions that it was in fact a Canadian horse. During the Expulsion of the Acadians in the mid-18th century, the English seized the livestock of the Acadians, including horses. Some of these animals were transported to Sable Island, where their descendants became the Sable Island horse. In the late 18th century, imported horses from the US and the British Isles were crossbred with existing Canadian stock. By the 19th century, they were found performing light draft work, as well as riding and driving duties. Cornelius Krieghoff, a 19th-century Canadian painter, was known for his works featuring the Canadian horse, who he usually showed in association with the French habitants, as opposed to the English settlers in the area. His paintings generally portrayed the Canadian horse in a utilitarian, workhorse role, often in winter scenes.

In 1849, there were estimated to be more than 150,000 Canadian horses, and many were exported from Canada annually. Some were shipped to the West Indies, where they possibly contributed to gaited breeds such as the Paso Fino. By the middle of the 19th century, Canadian horses had spread through the northeastern US, where they were used for racing, as roadsters, and, due to their stamina, to pull freight wagons and stagecoaches. Many played a role in the development of other breeds, including the Morgan horse, the American Saddlebred and the Standardbred. Although used extensively in the US, no efforts were made to establish a purebred population, studbook, or breed association in that country. Thousands of horses imported to the US from Canada were used as artillery and cavalry horses in the American Civil War, where many were killed. One equine historian states that "The Canadian horse played a major role in the history of that war; it has even been said that the North won simply on the fact that its soldiers had the better horse – the Canadian."

By 1880, through exports and war casualties, Canadian horses had almost become extinct. In 1885, the Canadian Horse Breeders Association was formed to inspect and approve breeding stock with the aim of creating a studbook for the breed, and in 1886, further export from Canada was forbidden by Quebec law. In 1913, an experimental breeding program was begun at Cap-Rouge by the Canadian government. The program's goal was to breed larger horses that retained the endurance and vitality for which the breed was known, and succeeded in increasing the size of stallions to 15.2 to 16 hands (62 to 64 inches, 157 to 163 cm) high and 1,200 to 1,500 pounds (540 to 680 kg) in weight, with mares slightly smaller. However, mechanization, combined with World War I and World War II, ended the federal breeding program, and in 1940 all breeding stock was sold at auction. However, the province of Quebec re-established the program at Deschambault. The program lasted there until 1979, when the herd was again disbanded and sold at auction.

=== 1970s to present ===
By the 1970s, the popularity of the breed had decreased significantly, and there were approximately 400 Canadian horses worldwide, with only around five annual registrations between 1970 and 1974. Several interested breeders began a campaign of preservation and promotion, which resulted in a Canadian team winning the 1987 North American Driving Championships. Popularity began to increase, and by the mid-1990s population numbers were between 2,500 and 3,000, and The Livestock Conservancy, which had classified the breed as "critical", changed its designation to "rare". With the increase in popularity came pressure for the breed standard to change to meet modern show and market trends, by breeding for taller horses with more refinement. In 2002, the Canadian Horse Heritage and Preservation Society was formed in response to these pressures, with a goal of preserving the original Canadian horse type. The Canadian Horse Breeders Association remains the official registering body for the Canadian horse, as governed by the Canadian federal Animal Pedigree Act, with the responsibility to "monitor registration, identification, and the keeping of the stud book for Canadian horses". It is also responsible for inspecting breeding stock before they are registered with the studbook. The studbook is maintained by the Canadian Livestock Records Corporation. Since the beginning of the studbook, there have been over 13,600 horses registered. In 2012, 208 new horses were registered, mainly in Quebec. The Livestock Conservancy still considers the breed to be threatened, a designation given to breeds with a global population of less than 5,000 and annual US registrations of fewer than 1,000. Rare Breeds Canada considers the breed to be at risk, with fewer than 500 annual registrations of female breeding stock.

In a study of mitochondrial DNA published in 2012, the Canadian horse and the Newfoundland pony were found to be the most genetically diverse of the Canadian breeds studied, which also included the Sable Island horse and the Lac La Croix pony. The Canadian horse showed high haplotype diversity, sharing haplotypes with all Canadian populations, as well as draft breeds, Nordic pony breeds and British mountain and moorland pony breeds also tested in the study. The Canadian horse had been shown to be related to draft horse breeds, including the Percheron, Belgian and Clydesdale, in previous microsatellite loci studies. This relationship was supported by findings in the 2012 study. The high levels of diversity in the Canadian horse supported the conclusions of a 1998 study, which determined that the small population size and historical genetic bottlenecks had not resulted in a significant loss of genetic variation. The 1998 paper also stated that the Canadian horse did not show inbreeding any more significant than other, more popular, breeds.

The Canadian horse is a common animal symbol of Canada. In 1909, the Parliament of Canada declared it the national breed of the country, and in 2002 was made an official animal symbol of Canada by Parliamentary Act. In 2010, the provincial legislature of Quebec named it a heritage breed of the province.

== Sub-types ==
During the peak popularity of the breed, three main types could be distinguished. All three are now considered extinct, having disappeared or been merged back into the main Canadian horse population. The first, the Canadian Heavy Draft or St. Lawrence, which disappeared by the late 1700s, probably developed from Shire and Clydesdale crosses. They were probably a popular export to New England, which bred large numbers of horses for Caribbean plantations. The second, the Frencher, sometimes also called the St. Lawrence, was a trotting horse known for its power and speed, resulting from crosses with Thoroughbreds. Mixed with French trotting lines, they played a role in the development of the US trotting horses. The third type was the Canadian Pacer, which was historically better documented than the other two types.

=== Canadian Pacer ===
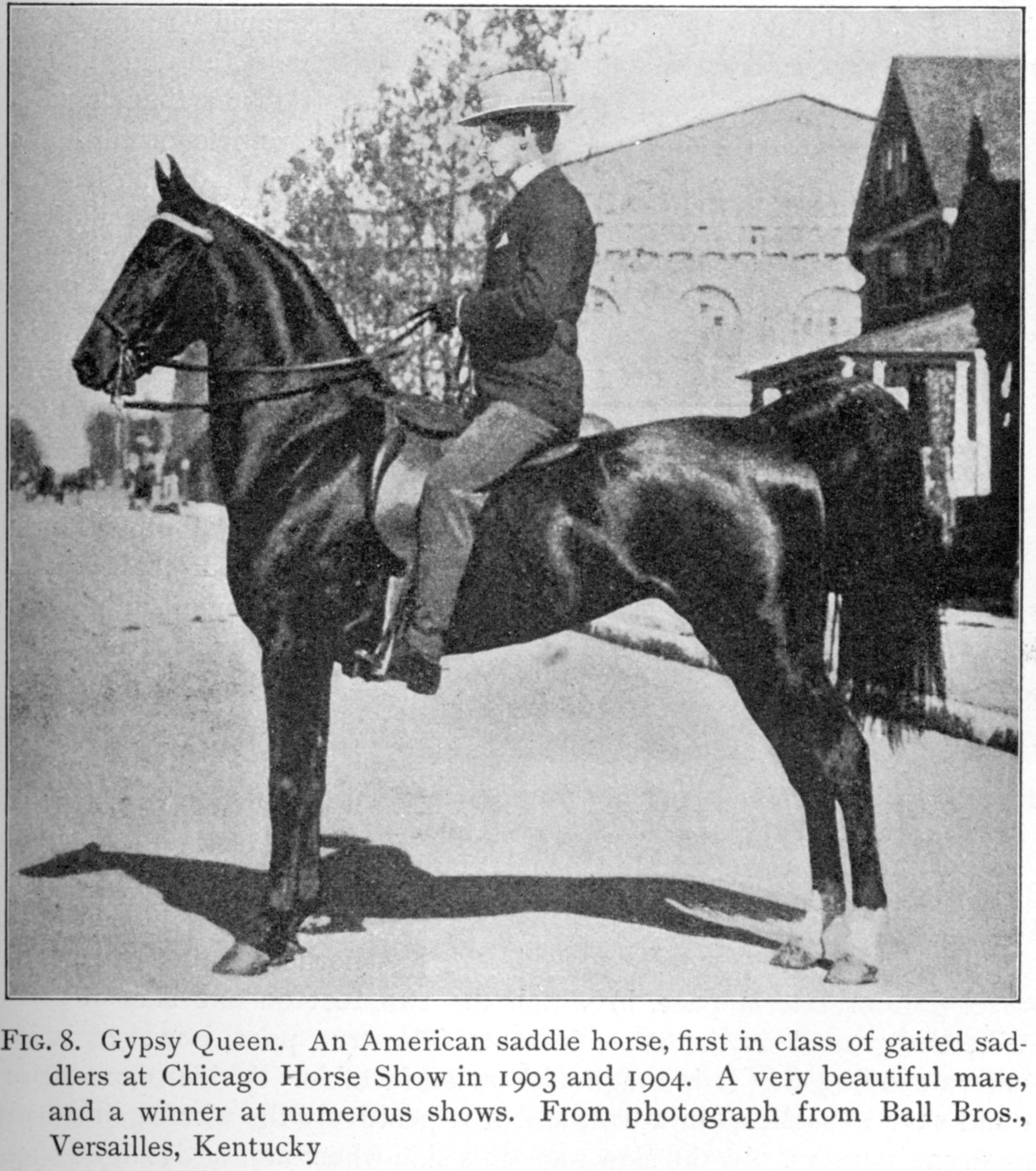
An American Saddlebred, a descendant of the Canadian Pacer, in the early 1900s

Canadian Pacers were likely the result of breeding pacing horses imported from France with Narragansett Pacers from New England. The resulting horses were known for their ability to race on ice. From there, they were exported to the United States, where North Carolina became a breeding centre, later exporting them to Tennessee in the late 1700s. Pedigrees were not maintained, so early breeding histories are often impossible to trace. The Canadian Pacer influenced the Tennessee Walker, the American Saddlebred and the Standardbred.

Commonly called "Canucks", the fastest members of the breed came from Quebec near the St. Lawrence River. Racing began in this area during the long, severe winters, when Sunday races after attending church for Mass became common. Eventually these races became large enough to endanger the church-going populace, and races were banned within a certain distance of churches. They instead moved to local rivers, whose smooth, frozen surfaces provided useful raceways, and the resulting contests drew attention to the pacers from Quebec.

Several horses imported to the United States from Canada had a lasting impact on American horse breeding. In the early 1800s, a roan-coloured stallion named Copperbottom was imported to Lexington, Kentucky, from Quebec, through Michigan. He began to be offered for stud service in 1816, and his progeny spread throughout the eastern US. Known mainly as saddle stock, they also included several pacing horses. Another roan stallion, Tom Hal, a successful pacer in his own right, founded an important family of pacers in the US. Appearing in Kentucky in 1824, he was offered for stud, and his offspring (many of whom carried on the family name, being differentiated only by the name of the owner) began the family of Standardbreds that included Little Brown Jug, Brown Hal, Star Pointer, Adios and Good Time, all champion harness racing horses. Another pacing import to the US was a black stallion named Old Pilot, said to have been bred near Montreal, who originated the Pilot family of trotting horses. Old Pilot produced a son, also named Pilot, who was acclaimed as a sire of trotting horses, as well as being a successful harness horse himself.
