= McKnight Foundation Collaborative Crop Research Program =

The Collaborative Crop Research Program (CCRP) is a project by Rebecca J. Nelson of Cornell University and Jane Maland Cady of the McKnight Foundation to fund participatory, collaborative research on agroecological intensification (AEI) for farming communities in Africa and South America. Funded projects typically link international, national, and local organizations with communities of smallholder farmers, researchers, development professionals, and other parties. Projects work together as part of a Community of Practice to generate technical and social innovations to improve nutrition, livelihoods, and productivity. Large-scale impact is realized when new ideas, technologies, or processes are adapted, when insights from research catalyze change in policy and practice, and when innovation inspires further success. The program is under the direction of

== Program History ==
The McKnight Foundation began funding crop research in 1983 with the Plant Biology Program and granted $18 million through the program from 1983 to 1992. The CCRP began in 1993 with a $12 million, six-year effort to support agricultural research in developing countries.

In 2000, McKnight committed another $41.5 million over nine years. In late 2001 and mid-2002, the CCRP's Advisory Committee met to design the strategy for the next phase of grantmaking and identified specific topics for funding.

In 2006, the CCRP adopted a place-based strategy for grantmaking, directing its investments to regional communities of practice in the Andes; West Africa; and Southern Africa.

In 2008, the Foundation committed $47 million over ten years for the next phase of funding for the program. In addition, the CCRP received a five-year $26.7 million grant from the Bill & Melinda Gates Foundation. This phase of funding allowed for the formation of an additional community of practice in East Africa and Horn of Africa as well as additional resources to allow for more technical support to grantees from regional teams and other support persons.

In 2013, The McKnight Foundation received a renewal grant from the Gates Foundation to continue building CCRP programs. This funding will allow the CCRP to increase its focus on the integration of legumes into the cropping systems of Mali, Burkina Faso, Uganda, Ethiopia, and Tanzania as well as Niger, Kenya, Malawi, and Mozambique. Legumes are very important to African agriculture. They're a major source of dietary protein and help sustain more fertile soils. And they tend to be more adaptable than other crops to drought, low nutrients, and other soil and climatic extremes.

== Place-based Learning ==
Central to the CCRP’s place-based approach is the formation of four regional communities of practice (CoPs) in Africa and South America, where hunger and poverty levels are among the highest in the world. Grantees within these communities work together to strengthen institutional capacity to generate knowledge and spark innovation in agriculture research and development. The CoP model emphasizes networking, learning, and collective action.

Andes CoP (Bolivia, Ecuador, and Peru) The Andes CoP supports integrated and diverse production systems that embrace conservation and native agricultural biodiversity as part of its goal to raise the profile of traditional knowledge and understanding its relationship to scientific research. Funding is directed toward conservation of agricultural biodiversity, breeding and variety selection, seed systems, integrated crop and pest management, risk management and climate variability, nutrition, soil fertility management, and market development.

East & Horn of Africa CoP (Ethiopia, Kenya, and Uganda) The E&HAf CoP aims to improve performance of farming systems primarily through support for crop diversification, for crop improvement and diversification, and an emphasis on management strategies that enhance crop access to scarce soil nutrients and water resources and reduce pest and disease losses. The CoP is also turning attention to post-harvest issues such as consumption, storage, transformation, and markets to increase the likelihood that greater crop diversity will lead to better diets and livelihoods.

Southern Africa CoP (Malawi, Mozambique, and Tanzania) The SAf CoP supports research on constraints to legume productivity, including foliar diseases, parasitic weeds, low availability of nitrogen and phosphorus as well as access to good quality planting seed. Recently the CoP has expanded its focus to include improvements in crop productivity and post-harvest practices; links between household food security and improved nutrition and incomes, with particular attention to the threat of aflatoxin contamination; and cross-cutting research in agriculture policy and communication.

West Africa CoP (Burkina Faso, Mali, and Niger) The WAf CoP is striving to improve productivity and nutritional content of cereals (sorghum, pearl millet, and fonio) and grain legumes (cowpea, groundnut, and Bambara groundnut) as well as other traditional or introduced crops. Strengthening farming systems demands continued attention to improved soil and water conservation and agronomic management; better seed varieties and seed distribution systems; integrated pest management; strengthened and diversified value chains; improved diets and nutrition; and improved income and education for farming families.

Each CoP is supported by a regional team consisting of a regional representative, a liaison scientist, a monitoring and evaluation specialist, and a research methods specialist. The regional team's activities include support for grantmaking processes and support for funded project teams. Each regional team develops a regional analysis, strategy, and plan to inform regional grantmaking. The regional representative and liaison scientist work with potential grantees to support development of proposals. The regional team builds relationships with project teams and helps project members and other stakeholders connect to each other to foster learning and inspiration. The regional team conducts site visits and provides feedback to project teams on annual reports and project meetings. Research methods support is provided in a range of formats, including meetings with individual teams, workshops, and online forums. Similarly, integrated monitoring, evaluation, and planning support is provided through individual consultants and workshops.

== Partial list of projects ==
   Yapuchiris II                            http://www.ccrp.org/projects/yapuchiris-ii
   Water security II                        http://www.ccrp.org/projects/water-security-ii
   Sustainable Production of Quinoa         http://www.ccrp.org/projects/sustainable-production-quinoa
   Soil nutrient budgets                    http://www.ccrp.org/projects/soil-nutrient-budgets
   Seed systems                             http://www.ccrp.org/projects/seed-systems-0
   SANREM                                   http://www.ccrp.org/projects/sanrem
   Quinoa sustainability                    http://www.ccrp.org/projects/quinoa-sustainability
   Quinoa III                               http://www.ccrp.org/projects/quinoa-iii
   Potato moth                              http://www.ccrp.org/projects/potato-moth
   Plot Diversification                     http://www.ccrp.org/projects/plot-diversification
   Organic groundnut III                    http://www.ccrp.org/projects/organic-groundnut-iii
   On-farm Conservation                     http://www.ccrp.org/projects/farm-conservation
   Nutrition support                        http://www.ccrp.org/projects/nutrition-support
   Native potato seed systems               http://www.ccrp.org/projects/native-potato-seed-systems
   Lupin/quinoa                             http://www.ccrp.org/projects/lupinquinoa
   Local Markets Cuzco                      http://www.ccrp.org/projects/local-markets-cuzco
   Laderas                                  http://www.ccrp.org/projects/laderas
   Green manures/legumes                    http://www.ccrp.org/projects/green-manureslegumes
   Food Sovereignty                         http://www.ccrp.org/projects/food-sovereignty
   Food security                            http://www.ccrp.org/projects/food-security
   Impact assessment of  Quinoa             http://www.ccrp.org/projects/financial-analysis-service-impact-assessment-quinoa
   Cover agriculture in the highland Andes  http://www.ccrp.org/projects/cover-agriculture-highland-andes
   Community baskets II                     http://www.ccrp.org/projects/community-baskets-ii
   Communal agricultural risk management    http://www.ccrp.org/projects/communal-agricultural-risk-management
   CLOSAN Impact Evaluation                 http://www.ccrp.org/projects/closan-impact-evaluation
   Climate risk management                  http://www.ccrp.org/projects/climate-risk-management
   Biopesticide/potato moth                 http://www.ccrp.org/projects/biopesticidepotato-moth
   Biodiversity of Andean tubers            http://www.ccrp.org/projects/biodiversity-andean-tubers
   Biodiversity and soil conservation       http://www.ccrp.org/projects/biodiversity-soil-conservation
   Andean pests                             http://www.ccrp.org/projects/andean-pests
   Andean Grain III                         http://www.ccrp.org/projects/andean-grain-iii
   Agrobiodiversity and Nutrition II        http://www.ccrp.org/projects/agrobiodiversity-nutrition-ii
   Soil fertility management                http://www.ccrp.org/projects/soil-fertility-management
   PV groundnut                             http://www.ccrp.org/projects/pv-groundnut
   P-Efficient Legumes III                  http://www.ccrp.org/projects/p-efficient-legumes-iii
   Legume Best Bets III                     http://www.ccrp.org/projects/legume-best-bets-iii
   Groundnut postharvest value chain        http://www.ccrp.org/projects/groundnut-postharvest-value-chain
   Groundnut Breeding III                   http://www.ccrp.org/projects/groundnut-breeding-iii
   Cowpea resistance to Alectra II          http://www.ccrp.org/projects/cowpea-resistance-alectra-ii
   Cowpea Alectra III                       http://www.ccrp.org/projects/cowpea-alectra-iii
   Climbing Beans II                        http://www.ccrp.org/projects/climbing-beans-ii
   Bruchid management II                    http://www.ccrp.org/projects/bruchid-management-ii
   Botanical pesticides/legumes             http://www.ccrp.org/projects/botanical-pesticideslegumes
   Bean Seed Delivery II                    http://www.ccrp.org/projects/bean-seed-delivery-ii
   Bambara Groundnut III                    http://www.ccrp.org/projects/bambara-groundnuts-iii
   Women ag production systems              http://www.ccrp.org/projects/women%E2%80%99s-ag-production-systems
   Technology Introduction                  http://www.ccrp.org/projects/technology-introduction
   Sorghum/millet improvement II            http://www.ccrp.org/projects/sorghummillet-improvement-ii
   Sorghum and millet improvement           http://www.ccrp.org/projects/sorghum-millet-improvement
   Soil and water conservation              http://www.ccrp.org/projects/soil-water-conservation
   Seed Systems Niger                       http://www.ccrp.org/projects/seed-systems-niger
   Seed Systems III                         http://www.ccrp.org/projects/seed-systems-iii
   Pathways to AEI                          http://www.ccrp.org/projects/pathways-aei
   P-efficient cowpea                       http://www.ccrp.org/projects/p-efficient-cowpea
   Grain Processing IV                      http://www.ccrp.org/projects/grain-processing-iv
   Grain legumes                            http://www.ccrp.org/projects/grain-legumes
   GIMEM III                                http://www.ccrp.org/projects/gimem-iii
   Fonio III                                http://www.ccrp.org/projects/fonio-iii
   Farmer-Led Research Networks             http://www.ccrp.org/projects/farmer-led-research-networks
   Farmer-led AEI in Burkina Faso           http://www.ccrp.org/projects/farmer-led-agroecological-intensification-burkina-faso
   Farmer Knowledge                         http://www.ccrp.org/projects/farmer-knowledge
   Dual-Purpose Sorghum and Cowpeas         http://www.ccrp.org/projects/dual-purpose-sorghum-cowpeas
   Bambara Nut II & III                     http://www.ccrp.org/projects/bambara-nut-ii-iii
   Bambara groundnut productivity           http://www.ccrp.org/projects/bambara-groundnut-productivity
