= Harold Logan =

New Zealand Standardbred racehorse

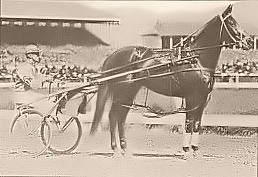
- Breed: Standardbred
- Sire: Logan Pointer (USA)
- Grandsire: Star Pointer
- Dam: Ivy Cole (NZ)
- Maternal grandsire: King Cole (NZ)
- Sex: Gelding
- Foaled: 1 September 1922
- Country: New Zealand
- Colour: Bay
- Breeder: J.J. ‘Jack’ Coffey
- Owner: 1. P. Brown; 2. Miss Effie Hinds (NZ)
- Trainer: 1. F.R. Legg; 2. R J ("Dick") Humphreys (NZ); 3. Miss Effie Hinds

Record
- 108 starts for 29 wins and 20 placings

Major wins
- 1931 New Zealand Trotting Cup; 1932 New Zealand Trotting Cup

Awards
- New Zealand Trotting Hall of Fame
- Last updated on: 2010-3-14.

Harold Logan was a New Zealand bred Standardbred pacer that won two New Zealand Trotting Cups. He was a leading performer in 1931 and 1932. In 1932, he won the New Zealand Trotting Cup with a handicap of 60 yards.

== Pedigree ==
Harold Logan was by the good sire, Logan Pointer (USA), his dam was the "non-Standardbred mare", Ivy Cole by King Cole. Logan Pointer sired 187 winners for a record £229,000 prize money. King Cole's second dam, Charity was a Thoroughbred mare.

== Race record ==
He won the following races:

- 1931 New Zealand Trotting Cup
- 1932 New Zealand Trotting Cup (handicap 60 Yards)

This was the richest harness race, and sometimes the richest horse race in New Zealand.

Harold Logan raced for the final time in 1938 at the age of 16.

He was an inaugural inductee into the New Zealand Trotting Hall of Fame with the immortals Caduceus, Cardigan Bay, Highland Fling, Johnny Globe and Ordeal.

Harold Logan died at Sefton on 14 April 1948.

== See also ==
- Harness racing
- Harness racing in New Zealand
