= Seeds of Diversity =

Seed of Diversity, Semences du patrimoine, is a Canadian charitable organization that aims to "search out, preserve, perpetuate, study, and encourage the cultivation of heirloom and endangered varieties of food crops", particularly Canadian plants, and to educate the public about their use. It has been called "The Canadian NGO leader in two key areas of food system sustainability: crop genetic diversity and the redesign of pollination strategies".

Seeds of Diversity originated in 1984 as the Heritage Seed Program of the Canadian Organic Growers organization.

Members of Seeds of Diversity propagate and share seeds and other plant material, and the organization also runs a "seed library" using seed-storage technology. Educational materials related to seed saving are a major focus of the organization. Seeds of Diversity acts as a central organizing force for Seedy Saturday events across Canada.

== History ==
In 1984, Canadian Organic Growers organized a conference on the loss of genetic diversity in food crops, with Kent Whealy the director of the U.S. organization Seed Savers Exchange as keynote speaker. Inspired by that conference, COG's Heritage Seed Program was initiated to help salvage Canada's crop-plant heritage, with Alex Caron as coordinator. In late 1987, after the HSP had lain dormant for about two years, Heather Apple, as a long-term organic gardener, past president of the Durham, Ontario chapter of COG, and a Seed Savers Exchange contributor, responded to a request from Alex Caron and volunteered to reinitiate the programme. Her aim was to develop it as a grass-roots seed-saving organization modelled after the Seed Savers Exchange, and beginning with an announcement in August 1988, she produced a separate newsletter for the program which became a magazine by December 1988.

By the second seed offering from HSP at the end of 1988, 14 contributing members of the program were offering 141 cultivars.

In 1989, the Heritage Seed Program received a 5-year grant from the W. Garfield Weston Foundation which allowed activities and publicity to expand, and grants from various organizations were subsequently applied for and received.

In 1995 the Heritage Seed Program of Canadian Organic Growers became incorporated and changed its English name to Seeds of Diversity while maintaining the French name Semences du patrimoine.

== Projects ==
=== Pollination Canada ===
Honey bees, which have traditionally been emphasized as important crop pollinators in Canada, did not exist in North America before they were introduced there by humans. In Western countries including Canada, honey bees have recently become prone to colony collapse disorder, which threatens the production of many insect-pollinated crops. Native bees are also in decline, which is partly due to loss of nesting sites in plant debris and in open untilled ground, and partly due to reduced diversity of food plants.

Seeds of Diversity initiated a project called Pollination Canada with the aim of increasing awareness of native bees and alternative pollinating insects in order to protect them, so that farmers and urban gardeners can decrease their dependence on honey bees. Pollination Canada has 28 other partner organizations.

=== The Bauta Family Initiative on Canadian Seed Security ===
In February 2013, Gretchen Bauta, Canadian philanthropist and daughter of W. Garfield Weston, launched through the W. Garfield Weston Foundation, a program to be administered by USC Canada and Seeds of Diversity. The aim of the program is to work with regional partners to "build a more secure and diverse ‘made-in-Canada’ seed supply" by promoting the production and use of locally adapted and diverse seed for crop plants.

== See also ==
- Rare Breeds Canada

== Publications ==
- Bob Wildfong; Andrew McLean; Kim Fellows; Judy Newman; Lyne Bellemare; Taarini Chopra; Paul Hrycyk; Su Morin, eds. (2013). How to save your own seeds: a handbook for home seed production. building on earlier work by: Heather Apple, Antoine d’Avignon, Rita-Lise Bergevin, and Diane Joubert (6th English ed.). Waterloo, ON: Seeds of Diversity Canada. ISBN 978-0-9810872-1-4.
- Bob Wildfong; Andrew McLean; Kim Fellows; Judy Newman; Lyne Bellemare; Taarini Chopra; Paul Hrycyk; Su Morin, eds. (2013). La conservation des semences: Guide de production à petit échelle. building on earlier work by: Heather Apple, Antoine d’Avignon, Rita-Lise Bergevin, and Diane Joubert (6th French ed.). Waterloo, ON: Seeds of Diversity Canada. ISBN 978-0-9810872-2-1.
- Newman, Judy (2009). Every Seed Tells a Tale: Stories of Plants, People and Places that Have Contributed to Canada's Seed Heritage. Seeds of Diversity Canada. ISBN 978-0-9810872-0-7.
