= Assetou Foune Samake Migan =

Malian minister of higher education, Assetou Migan

Assetou Foune Samake Migan (born 1960) is a Malian politician currently serving as the Malian Minister of Higher Education and Scientific Research. She taught plant physiology at the Ecole Normale Supérieure of Bamako from 1993 to 2000 before working with Winrock International from 2000 to 2004, the Polycentric Social Forum in Bamako from 2005 to 2006, the African Institute of Food and Sustainable Development from 2005 to 2009, the Unitarian Services of Canada from 2011 to 2013, the Forum for Another Mali, and the Ministry of National Reconciliation and Northern Development in 2013. She served as a technical advisor at the Ministry of Higher Education and Scientific Research before her appointment to Minister in 2016.

== Early life and education ==
Assétou Founè Samaké Migan was born in 1960, in San, Mali. She went on to receive a doctorate in biological sciences at Kharkiv National University in the former USSR, specializing in plant genetics. She then received a certificate in agricultural biotechnology at Cheikh Anta Diop University’s UNESCO Biotechnology Laboratory in Dakar, Senegal.

== Career ==
Migan taught plant physiology as well as supervised dissertations and teaching at the Ecole Normale Supérieure of Bamako—a public higher education institution in Bamako, Mali—from 1993 to 2000. Then, from 2000 to 2004, she worked as a program assistant for Women of Agriculture and Environment at Winrock International, a nonprofit organization focused on American and international development with a mission to promote empowerment, economic stability, and sustainability^{,}. Through her work there, Migan was involved with programming that prevented trafficking and child labor in the Sikasso region. From 2005 to 2006, she was in charge of methodology at the Polycentric World Social Forum in Bamako, Mali, a yearly meeting of civil society organizations working toward a future free from hegemonic neoliberal globalization^{,}. Then, Migan became Scientific Coordinator at the Institute of Research and Promotion of Alternatives in Development (IRPAD), a think tank promoting ‘socialized’ multidisciplinary research, skill-building, and capacity-building actions to influence policy that she co-founded^{,}. Through her work there from 2006 to 2009, she developed and coordinated programs and projects related to the institute's mission.

In 2009, Migan became the program manager at the African Institute of Food and Sustainable Development. Soon after, she began working with the Unitarian Services of Canada, a non-profit international development organization devoted to fostering ecological agriculture. Specifically, the organization works toward enhancing resilience in Mali through community seed banks and farmer networks. Migan was then selected as the representative of the USC Canada in Mali, Senegal, and Burkina Faso—a position she held from May 2011 to July 2013.

She entered Mali's Ministry of National Reconciliation and Northern Development in November 2013 as a technical advisor, contributing to the maintenance of peace in the nation after the Malian military coup in 2012 and the reinstatement of democratic governmental rule in 2013^{,}. Specifically, she was responsible for the Northern Development Agency United Nations Platform for the Sahel, World Bank, UN Development Program, and provision of technical support to non-governmental organizations partaking in reconciliation activities. Over the course of her professional life, from 1997 until her appointment as Malian Minister of Higher Education and Scientific Research in 2016, Migan was both a professor and researcher at the University of Sciences, Techniques and Technologies of Bamako, Mali.

Beyond all of these positions, Migan is currently a consulting member of the Pedagogical Committee for Seed Continuing Education as well as a promoter of biotechnology in agriculture in the West African Economic and Monetary Union (WAEMU) area. She is also a principal researcher on the “Impact Assessment of Land Acquisition on Agriculture in West Africa,” a member of the Association Lecture au Féminin, the Forum for Another Mali, the Regional Coordination of the Coalition for the Protection of African Genetic Heritage (COPAGEN), and the founder of the African Institute of Food and Sustainable Development.

She has served as a consultant for the development of didactic tools for plant education at the Institute of Popular Education (IEP), the organization and animation of a training workshop for members of farmers’ organizations on agricultural research and food sovereignty, the implementation of active pedagogy at the University of Bamako Faculty of Sciences for the Lead, Learn and Read (LLR) Program of the Flora Hewlett Association, and the development of didactic tools for the International Kungoso Environmental Education Camp.

In the past, Migan was a member of the Board of Directors of the NGO GRAIN, the Steering Committee of the Democratic Inquiry Space (ECID) on Agricultural Research, the Scientific Committee of SEXAGON in the Office du Niger, and the Consumers Association of Mali.

== Personal life ==
Migan is married and a mother to one child. She speaks Bamanan, French, Russian, and English. In her free time, she enjoys walking and reading.

== Views on higher education and scientific research ==
As technical advisor to the former Minister of Higher Education and Scientific Research Mountaga Tall, Migan presented on the theme of scientific research as a development factor at the International Conference Center of Bamako (CICB) on behalf of President Ibrahim Boubacar Keita’s administration [MW1] [HM2] on December 28, 2015. Migan focused on the state of research and innovation in Mali, calling for policy to promote the growth of scientific research while acknowledging the obstacles facing researchers and the institutions that support them. Some of these obstacles included inadequate human resources, aging staff, overextended students, insufficient funding (specifically in the lack of a private sector to supply funding), budget cuts, and deficient governmental guidance. Her challenging of the government to commit to the advancement of this area—and, by extension, higher education—paid off in that President Keita promoted her to Minister of Higher Education and Scientific Research not long afterward.

One of Migan’s main goals as Minister of Higher Education and Scientific Research is the popularization of research through committed engagement with farmers’ organizations in order to optimize yields by improving plants genetically. Migan maintains that “science […] and technology have become, today, essential areas for socioeconomic development of nations,” allowing “man to know himself as well as his physical and social environment—his near and distant environment.” She aims to raise the level of Malian children engaged in science so that they are properly equipped to face the barriers to development, such as food security, sustainable use of raw materials, adequacy of living conditions, and growth of cities. Ultimately, she hopes that scientists will be enabled “to meet the demands of an increasingly skill-hungry market in order to accelerate the transition to a developed, knowledge-based society.”

== Controversy ==
In light of the two-month strike of the National Union of Higher Education and Scientific Research in 2017, Dr. Abdou Mallé, Secretary General of Snesup, called for the dismissal of Assétou Founè Samaké Migan from her position as Minister of Higher Education and Scientific Research on grounds of incompetence. All universities and colleges were closed because of this strike. Snesup maintained that Migan would not take responsibility and dismiss Ousmane Papa Kanté, Dean of the Faculty of Economics and Management (FSEG), who was accused of anti-pedagogical practices, including the selling of notes to students, unauthorized closing of classrooms, tampering with overtime, and replacing permanent teachers with acting teachers through the use of police force during said strike. Beyond this, the union also demanded an increase in the current grid ceiling, increasing the pay of teaching staff and researchers given that Malians make 1,210 FCFA as compared to their colleagues in Niger (2,750 FCFA), Senegal (4,064 FCFA), and Burkina Faso (3,380 FCFA). Dr. Mallé claimed that only the dismissal of Minister Migan could keep the academic year from becoming a wash. Ultimately, Migan called for the suspension of Dean Ousmane Papa Kanté on June 15, 2017, thereby appeasing Snesup.

== Positions held ==
=== Professional ===
- Professor/researcher at the University of Bamako / University of Sciences, Technologies and Techniques of Bamako (1997–present)
- Professor at the Ecole Normale Supérieure of Bamako (1993-2000)
- Migan provided courses in plant physiology, supervised dissertations and teaching courses
- Program Assistant for Women of Agriculture and Environment at Winrock International (2000-2004)
- Migan assisted with program preventing trafficking and child labor in Sikasso region
- Polycentric Social Forum of Bamako (2005-2006)
- Migan was responsible for methodology
- Program Manager at African Institute of Food and Sustainable Development (IAD) (2005-2006)
- Scientific Coordinator at Institute of Research and Promotion of Alternatives in Development (IRPAD) (2006-2009)
- Migan developed and coordinated programs, projects connected to institute's mission
- Representative of Mali, Senegal, and Burkina Faso for Unitarian Services of Canada (USC Canada) (May 2011-July 2013)
- Technical Advisor for Ministry of National Reconciliation and Development of Northern Regions (November 2013-June 2014)
- Migan's responsibilities included: oversight of Northern Development Agency (AND), United Nations Platform for the Sahel, World Bank/UNDP, technical support to NGOs involved in reconciliation activities

=== Community life ===
- Co founder of the Institute for Research and Promotion of Alternatives in Development (IRPAD) in Mali
- Member of the Association Lecture au Féminin
- Member of the Forum for Another Mali (FORAM)
- Member of the Regional Coordination of the Coalition for the Protection of African Genetic Heritage (COPAGEN) in Abidjan, Ivory Coast (2004 to the present)
- Former Member of the Board of Directors of the NGO GRAIN in Barcelona Spain
- Founder of the African Institute of Food and Sustainable Development (IAD)
- Former Member of the Steering Committee of the Democratic Inquiry Space (ECID) on Agricultural Research (Kéné Conseil / Mali)
- Former member of the Scientific Committee of SEXAGON in the Office du Niger
- Former member of the Consumers Association of Mali (ASCOMA)

=== Consultations ===
- Senior Researcher on "Impact Assessment of Land Acquisition on Agriculture in West Africa
- Consultant and member of the Pedagogical Committee for Seed Continuing Education and the holistic foundation of biotechnology in agriculture in UEMOA, Benin (2007-2011)
- Consultant on Critical Analysis of USC Canada Programs in Mali
- Consultant for the development of didactic tools for plant education in the bilingual pilot school of the Institute of Popular Education (IEP), Kati, Mali (2008)
- Consultant for the organization and animation of the training workshop of the members of farmers' organizations on agricultural research and food sovereignty in Mali (Kenya Council, Mali, 2009)
- Consultant for the evaluation of the USC Canada Program in Douentza, Mali (USC Canada 2009–2010)
- Consultant for the implementation of active pedagogy at the University of Bamako, Faculty of Sciences (Apprenticeship Service) for the Lead, Learn and Read (LLR) program of the Flora Hewlett Foundation, IEP of Kati (2009-2010)
- Consultant for the development of didactic tools for the living plant collection and photographs of International Kungoso Environmental Education Camp (Kungoso International Camp, Mali)

== See also ==
- Politics of Mali
