= Heather Elizabeth Apple =

Canadian writer, artist and educator (born 1948)

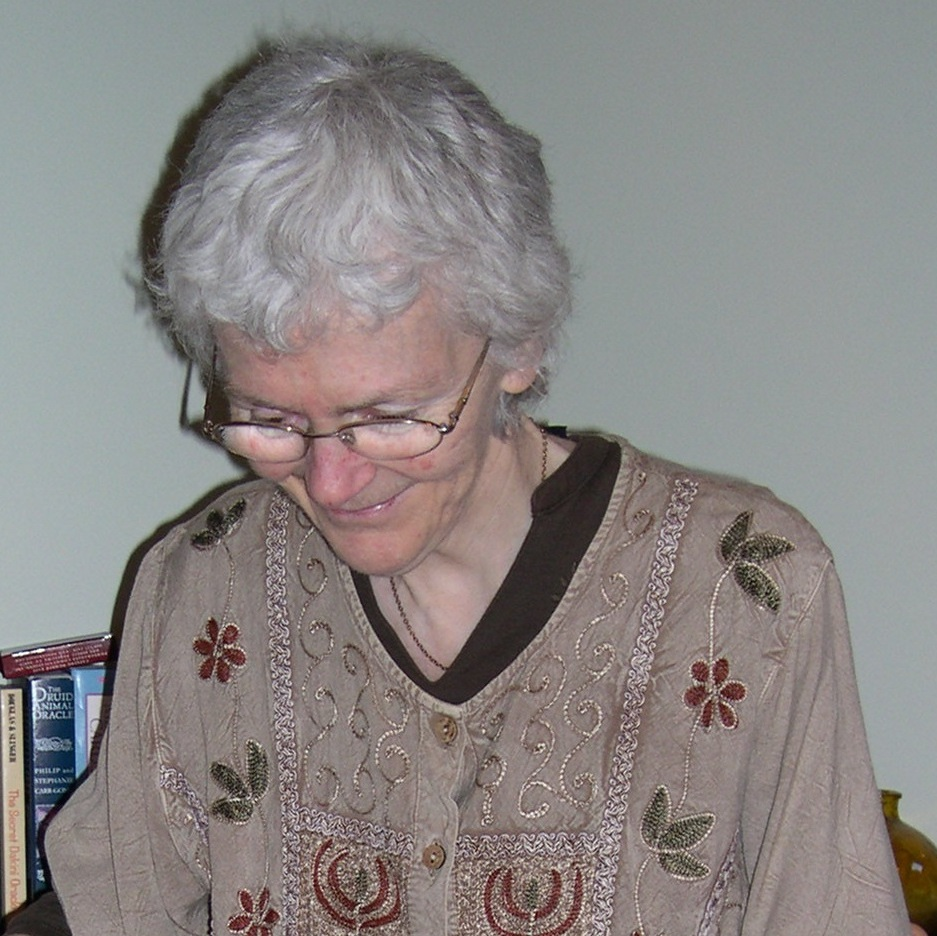
- Heather Apple (2013)
- Born: 1948 (age 77–78) Toronto

Heather Elizabeth Apple (born 1948) is a Canadian writer, artist, and educator, with an interest in organic horticulture. She was awarded a 125th Anniversary of the Confederation of Canada Medal in 1992.

== Early life ==
She attended Branksome Hall, and graduated in 1967, then earned a B.Sc. Honours degree in 1972 in biology from the University of Toronto.

== Heritage and organic agriculture ==
In 1984, Canadian Organic Growers (COG) organized a conference on the loss of genetic diversity in food crops, with Kent Whealy the director of the U.S. organization Seed Savers Exchange as keynote speaker. Inspired by that conference, COG's Heritage Seed Program (HSP) was initiated to help salvage Canada's crop-plant heritage, with Alex Caron as coordinator. In late 1987, after the HSP had lain dormant for about two years, Heather Apple, as a long-term organic gardener, past president of the Durham, Ontario chapter of COG, and a Seed Savers Exchange contributor, responded to a request from Alex Caron and volunteered to reinitiate the programme. Her aim was to develop it as a grass-roots seed-saving organization modeled after the Seed Savers Exchange, and beginning with an announcement in August 1988, she produced a separate newsletter for the program which became a magazine by December 1988.

The Heritage Seed Program/Semences du patrimoine grew to become Seeds of Diversity Canada/Semences du patrimoine (SoDC), incorporated and renamed in 1995; Apple served as president of SoDC thru 1993. She also served as vice president of the Society of Ontario Nut Growers (SONG), 1990–1991.

== Art ==
Heather Apple has been a member of the board of directors of the Gibsons Public Art Gallery in Gibsons, British Columbia, and of the Gibsons Landing Fibre Arts Festival. She is an active member of the Sunshine Coast Spinners and Weavers Guild, and the Sunshine Coast Fibreshed.

== Writing ==
Heather Apple began writing seriously about gardening for the Heritage Seed Program, and this grew into freelance work as a garden writer, primarily for magazines.

== Selected appearances ==
- hosted by David Maybury-Lewis; written by Adrian Malone; produced by Michael Grant and Richard Meech (1992). Millennium: Tribal Wisdom and the Modern World. Episode 4. an ecology of mind (videotape). Toronto: Biniman Productions Ltd.

== Selected works ==
- Heather Apple produced the first two editions, 1990 and 1992, of the Seeds of Diversity publication How to save your own seeds: a handbook for home seed production.
- Heather Apple (December 1999 – January 2000). "Simply Sprouts: growing healthy sprouts is easy, and quick: seeds take an average of six days to grow into succulent shoots". Canadian Gardening. 10 (7): 49. National Magazine Award Winner 2000, Honorable Mention, Category 18: How-to
- Articles in The Organic Companion: Gleanings from Canadian Organic Growers. Janet Wallace, Canadian Organic Growers Inc. 2005. ISBN 0969585187.
- 17 articles in Primeau, L., ed. (2003). The cook's garden: 100 favourite recipes and expert growing advice from Canadian gardening magazine. Toronto: McArthur & Company. ISBN 1552783472.
