= Clyde Sanger =

English-Canadian journalist (1928–2022)

Clyde William Sanger MA (20 November 1928 – 20 January 2022) was an English-Canadian journalist and author. He worked on newspapers in the UK and Africa before becoming the first Africa correspondent for The Guardian newspaper in 1960. He moved to North America in 1965, where he continued to work as a journalist, as well as for various Canadian and international research and development institutes. He wrote extensively on politics, economics, international development, the environment and other subjects throughout his long career. He lived in Ottawa, Ontario, Canada.

== Early life and education ==
Sanger studied at Twyford School (1938 to 1942) and Shrewsbury School (1942 to 1947), where he was Head of School. He spent 1947 to 1949 doing his National Service on the Suez Canal as a second lieutenant in the 4th Royal Tank Regiment. He then studied at Brasenose College, Oxford University (1949 to 1952).

== Professional work ==
Sanger spent his early career as a reporter for the Staffordshire Evening Sentinel, the London Evening News and the Daily Mail. In 1957 he moved to Southern Rhodesia (now Zimbabwe) and became editor of a magazine on politics and economics, The Central African Examiner. In 1959 he joined The Guardian newspaper, becoming their first Africa correspondent in 1960. His work focused mainly on Central, Southern and Eastern Africa, and from 1957 to 1965 he covered news stories of a social, economic, environmental and political nature, getting to know nationalist leaders such as Joshua Nkomo and Ndabaningi Sithole of Zimbabwe, Dr. Hastings (Kumuzu) Banda of Malawi, and Kenneth Kaunda of Zambia.

Sanger's words were quoted in the UK House of Commons by James Callaghan, then MP for Cardiff South-East, in relation to the politically-motivated expulsion of John Stonehouse, MP for Wednesbury, from Rhodesia and Nyasaland. The sometimes dangerous nature of life as a journalist is described in an entertaining memoir by Peter Rand, in an episode involving several Western journalists including Sanger, at the time of the Zanzibar Revolution in 1963.

Sanger moved to North America in 1965, and worked as UN correspondent and Canada correspondent for The Guardian, Parliamentary reporter for The Globe and Mail, and Canada correspondent for The Economist; he also contributed regularly to the Gemini News Service. In addition, he served as a Governor of NewsConcern International Foundation, Director of Information for The Commonwealth Secretariat, Director of Communications for the North-South Institute, and adjunct professor in the School of Journalism and Communication, Carleton University. Later in his career he also taught MA students at the University for Peace, Costa Rica.

== Publications ==
Sanger wrote prolifically on the subjects of African and Canadian politics, the Commonwealth, international development, and the environment, as reflected in the following list of publications.

=== Books ===
- Central African Emergency, Toronto: Heinemann, 1960.
- Half a loaf; Canada's semi-role among developing countries, Toronto: Ryerson Press, 1969.
- Bread and better things, Ottawa: International Development Research Centre, 1975.
- Project Impact: a progress report on Innotech Project Impact in the Philippines and Proyek Pamong in Indonesia, Ottawa: International Development Research Centre, 1977.
- Trees for people: an account of the forestry research program supported by the International Development Research Centre, Ottawa: International Development Research Centre, 1977.
- The politics of human survival: a report on the United Nations Parliamentary Forum, 21–23 September, New York: Parliamentarians for World Order, 1981.
- Safe and sound: disarmament and development in the eighties, London: Zed Press, 1982.
- Politicians for peace: a report on the work of Parliamentarians for World Order, New York: Parliamentarians For World Order, 1982.
- Stitches in Time: the Commonwealth in world politics, with Arnold Smith, Canada, 1983.
- Three strands of rope, Ottawa: International Development Research Centre, c.1983.
- Global action for survival: a report on the work of Parliamentarians for World Order, New York: Parliamentarians for World Order, c.1983.
- Ordering the oceans: the making of the Law of the Sea, London: Zed Press, 1986.
- Lotta and the Unitarian Service Committee story, Toronto: Stoddard, 1986. A biography of Lotta Hitschmanova, Canadian humanitarian.
- Canadians and the United Nations, Ottawa: Communications and Culture Branch, Department of External Affairs, 1988.
- Namibia, fraud or freedom? Ottawa: International Defence and Aid Fund Canadian Committee, 1989.
- Namibia: the black man's burden, with David Stafford, Toronto: Canadian Institute of International Affairs, 1990.
- Travels with a laptop: Canadian journalists head south: an anthology, (ed.) Ottawa: North-South Institute, 1994.
- The role of elections in societal reconciliation, Halifax: Dalhousie University, 1995.
- Malcolm MacDonald: bringing an end to empire, Montreal: McGill-Queen's University Press, 1995.
- Glories of the Glebe: 42 conversations with friends, A collection of articles from the Glebe Report, Ottawa, 2008.
- Coming of age in Kentucky : politicians, editors ... and mermaids, Ottawa, 2019. A memoir based on a diary Sanger kept during a visit to Kentucky, USA, in 1954.

=== Articles (selection available online) ===
- 'Toward Unity in Africa', Foreign Affairs, January 1964.
- 'The Beatles on fringe of a riot', The Guardian, 17 August 1966.
- 'The high cost of 'free' trade', book review, The Globe and Mail, 28 June 2003.
- 'Lesson for Kenya: Know when to go', 9 January 2008.
- 'Newspeak in the 21st Century', book review, Media Lens, 4 January 2011. A rare insight into Sanger's lifetime of experience as a journalist, as he reviews a book about journalism written by non-journalists.
- 'People of the Glebe: Flora McDonald', Glebe Report, Ottawa, 19 September 2014.

== Archive ==
In 2018 Sanger donated his large archive of notebooks, letters, newspaper cuttings, draft articles and reports to The Guardian News & Media Archive (GNM). Cataloguing was carried out in 2019. The archive covers his life and work in Africa and the American continent from 1957 to 2008. The main subjects are African politics and society, the role of the United Nations, the Commonwealth, and the freedom of the press. Highlights include independence for Kenya (1963), Zanzibar (1964), Malawi (1964), Zimbabwe (1980) and Namibia (1990), and Ian Smith's unilateral declaration of independence for Rhodesia (1965). The archive includes more than 100 pocket notebooks from his work in Eastern, Central and Southern Africa from 1960 to 1965, covering elections, the economy, land reforms, decolonisation and civil unrest. A large proportion of the notebooks are written in Pitman shorthand, which are undergoing a digitised transcription process before they can be made available for research. An online catalogue is already available.

Another archival item, in Sanger's handwriting (also containing newspaper cuttings, cartoons and photographs), is a large notebook entitled 'Journal of an Extraordinary Heads of Government Meeting, Lusaka, Zambia, August 1979', but covering many other dates and events from February to September of that year, held by the School of Advanced Study, University of London.

== Personal and family life ==
Sanger married the journalist and activist Penny Ketchum (1931-2017) in Surrey, in June 1959; they had four sons (Matthew, Richard, Toby and Daniel) and ten grandchildren (Ariel, Maeve, Malcolm, Claire, Louis, Tommy, Alia, Adam, Antoine and Eliza). In his later years he enjoyed writing poetry, some of which was published in The Glebe Report in Ottawa.
