= Johnny Globe =

New Zealand Standardbred racehorse

Johnny Globe (NZ)
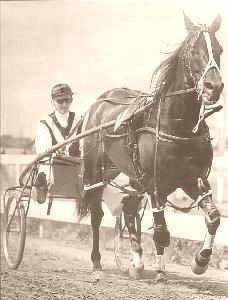
- Johnny Globe and D.G. Nyhan
- Breed: Standardbred
- Sire: Logan Derby
- Grandsire: Globe Derby
- Dam: Sandfast
- Maternal grandsire: Sandydale (USA)
- Sex: Stallion
- Foaled: 1947
- Country: New Zealand
- Colour: Bay
- Breeder: Mr F.E. Ward
- Owner: Don G. Nyhan
- Trainer: Don G. Nyhan

Record
- 99: 34 wins and 45 places

Earnings
- £42,887/10/-

Major wins
- 1950 Great Northern Derby; 1950 New Zealand Trotting Derby; 1954 New Zealand Trotting Cup

Awards
- Leading New Zealand sire (4 times)

Honours
- New Zealand Trotting Hall of Fame
- Last updated on: 29 July 2011.

Johnny Globe was an outstanding New Zealand bred Standardbred pacer that held four world records. He is notable in that he won the New Zealand Trotting Cup. Johnny Globe is also notable in winning 15 free-for-all pacing events, which at the time was a record. He was also a leading New Zealand sire on four occasions.

Johnny Globe was by Logan Derby, who was very successful harness racer in Australia. His dam, Sandfast, was by Sandydale (USA) from the American pacing mare Slapfast, a yearling record-holder in the States in her day, and who was imported to the New Zealand by Sir John McKenzie. Don Nyhan purchased Johnny Globe from the horse's breeder, Mr F E Ward as a small 10-month-old foal for £50 for his wife, Doris. Nyhan had trained his dam Sandfast for Ward, and knew she had ability after a time trial over a mile in 2.10 at Hutt Park as a two-year-old.

== Racing record ==
As a four-year-old in the 1951/52 season Johnny Globe, was the leading stake-winner with £9,360 and was a close second between Van Dieman and Young Charles in the New Zealand Cup.

Johnny Globe won the following major races:

- 1950 Great Northern Derby, beating Centrepoise and Holden
- 1950 New Zealand Trotting Derby, beating Vivanti and Kapeen
- 1954 New Zealand Trotting Cup, beating Young Charles and Rupee, from a 48 yards handicap in a world record time of 4:07 3/5.

He held world records for a mile against the clock on the grass at Epsom in 1:59.8; a mile from a standing start in a race in 2:01.2, and 11 furlongs in a race in 2:50.2. Johnny Globe also holds the New Zealand 1¼ mile record for a three-year-old, in 2:37.6.

Johnny Globe possessed a calm temperament, such that even as an older stallion he permitted children to ride him bareback and happily accepted Doris bathing his troublesome hooves.

== Stud record ==
He was retired to stand at Globe Lodge, but received poor patronage owing to a bias against New Zealand-bred stallions. In the first year he had 10 mares booked to him and managed to sire Lordship, who won 45 races including the New Zealand Trotting Cup in 1962 and 1966 and the Auckland Pacing Cup in 1964. Lordship also became a good sire.

Johnny Globe was also a leading New Zealand sire on four occasions from 1970 to 1973. He was the sire of: 142 New Zealand bred winners, 99 pacers (6 in 2.00), 45 trotters (includes totals of N.Z. wins and N.Z. stake money)

== Honours ==
He was an inaugural inductee into the New Zealand Trotting Hall of Fame along with the immortals Caduceus, Cardigan Bay, Harold Logan, Highland Fling and Ordeal.

== See also ==
- Harness racing in New Zealand
