= Cardigan Bay (horse) =

New Zealand Standardbred racehorse

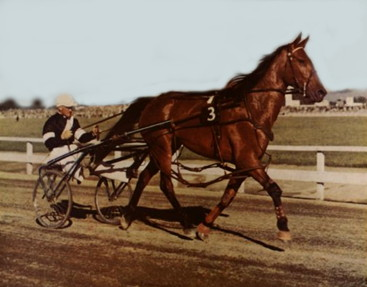
- Breed: Standardbred
- Sire: Hal Tryax (USA)
- Grandsire: Tryax
- Dam: Colwyn Bay
- Damsire: Josedale Dictator (USA)
- Sex: Gelding
- Foaled: 1956
- Died: 1988
- Country: New Zealand
- Colour: Bay
- Breeder: Dave & Sandy Todd
- Owner: Merv and Audrey Dean
- Trainer: Dave Todd (New Zealand); Peter Wolfenden (New Zealand); Stanley Dancer (United states)
- Record: 154: 80-25-22
- Earnings: US$1,000,837

Major wins
- 1961 & 1963 Auckland Pacing Cup; 1963 New Zealand Trotting Cup; 1963 Inter Dominion; 1961 & 1963 New Zealand Free For All; 1964 & 1965 Good Time Pace; 1965 American Pacing Classic; 1965 & 1966 National Pacing Derby; 1966 International Pace; 1966 National Championship Pace; 1966 Nassau Pace

Awards
- 1965 and 1968 USA Aged Pacer of the Year

Honours
- New Zealand Trotting Hall of Fame; First standardbred to win $1 million
- Last updated on 29 July 2011

Cardigan Bay (1 September 1956-1988) was a New Zealand harness pacer racehorse. Affectionately known as "Cardy", he was the ninth horse worldwide to win US$1 million in prize money, and the first Standardbred, with the previous eight horses all being Thoroughbreds. Cardigan Bay won races in New Zealand, Australia, Canada and the United States.

Along with his arch-rival, American champion of the day, Bret Hanover, Cardigan Bay has "a legitimate claim to be one of the truly great Standardbred racehorses". Cardigan Bay became an overnight sensation in the United States, and appeared with Stanley Dancer on The Ed Sullivan Show as the "million dollar horse".

== Breeding ==
Cardigan Bay was foaled at Mataura in the Southland Region of the South Island of New Zealand. On the road to Mataura from Gore, there is a sign on the road proclaiming Mataura as the birthplace of Cardigan Bay. He was a first crop foal by a leading sire, Hal Tryax (USA) and his dam Colwyn Bay was by Josedale Dictator (USA). Cardigan Bay was a brother to Thule Bay and a half-brother to Brides Bay.

== Racing career ==
He began racing in the South Island of New Zealand and gained his first stake money in a saddle pace on a grass track, when narrowly beaten into second. Ascending rapidly to the top level, he went on to win many of New Zealand's major open class races including the New Zealand Trotting Cup, a pacing race despite the name, and the Auckland Cup (from a 78 yard handicap). His driver in New Zealand was Peter Wolfenden, who became the country's number one driver during the 1970s. Cardigan Bay even won a major race at Addington Raceway in Christchurch while the grandstand there was on fire. A photo of this race is considered one of the great iconic images in the history of horse racing. Cardigan Bay also won an Inter Dominion Pacing Championship final in Adelaide, Australia. His career in his later years saw him become the first pacer worldwide to achieve lifetime earnings of $1 million (USD).

=== 1960-61 season ===
After winning at Forbury Park, Dunedin in April 1961 Cardigan Bay was sold to Merv and Audrey Dean of Auckland for £2500. His record at that time was 12 starts for 5 wins and 2 second places.

=== 1961-62 season ===
In the spring and early summer of 1961-62 Cardigan Bay continued a winning sequence begun late the previous season before his sale to the Deans. He won the New Zealand Free For All at Addington during a grandstand fire and won the Auckland Pacing Cup which was his 10th consecutive win, equalling the New Zealand record, before finishing fifth to Samantha in the Champion Hcp during the Auckland Cup carnival. He then travelled to Australia to compete in the Inter Dominion Championships at Gloucester Park, Perth, Western Australia. After winning easily on the first and second nights of the Championships Cardigan Bay was to meet James Scott, the only horse handicapped behind him in the series and also an impressive winner on the first two nights, on night three. Cardigan Bay was then involved in a disastrous trackwork accident which could have ended his racing career and placed his life in jeopardy. He was able to be saved but the injury resulted in one hip being permanently lower than the other. The season saw Cardigan Bay win 7 of 9 starts in New Zealand with one second place.

=== 1962-63 season ===
Cardigan Bay recovered surprisingly well from his injuries and returned to racing in Auckland in September 1962. He travelled to Addington for the New Zealand Cup meeting where he placed fifth in the Cup and second in the New Zealand Free For All, both behind Lordship. However he won the Matson and Smithson Handicaps on the remaining two days of the meeting. Back in Auckland he finished second from 48 yards behind in the Auckland Pacing Cup and won the Champion Hcp from 36 yards. The season saw him start 12 times in New Zealand for 7 wins and 4 seconds. Cardigan Bay then made a second trip to Australia and won the Summer Cup at Harold Park, Sydney, from a handicap of 24 yards behind. In Adelaide for the 1963 Inter Dominion at the Wayville Showgrounds he won two heats before beating Dusty Miller and fellow New Zealander Waitaki Hanover by 1 ½ yards in the final from 24 yards behind. Racing again in Sydney, he started 5 times for four wins and a second place in the Lord Mayors Cup behind Waitaki Hanover from 48 yards. The season saw him start 12 times in New Zealand for 7 wins and 4 seconds.

=== 1963-64 season ===
Cardigan Bay won the 1963 New Zealand Cup by two lengths from Robin Dundee and the remainder of what was described as one of the best fields for many years. He then won the New Zealand Free For All on the second day of the Cup meeting at Addington. In the Matson Hcp he reduced the national record for 13 furlongs held by False Step from 3.21.0 to 3.18.1 starting from a 54-yard handicap and then won the Ollivier Hcp on the fourth day of the meeting. In December he time trialled in 1.56.1 at Wellington's Hutt Park lowering the previous record of 1.57.3. Then came a win in the Auckland Pacing Cup from 78 yards and in January 1964 he won the Pezaro Memorial at Alexandra Park in his last New Zealand race. He won 10 of 14 New Zealand races during the season with one second and one third place. Visiting Sydney before the 1964 Inter Dominion he was third in the Summer Cup before contesting the Inter Dominion Championships which were held at the Melbourne Showgrounds. During the championships it was announced that he had been sold to American interests for £35,800 (US$100,000). Cardigan Bay won a heat but in the final Minuteman led all the way from the front mark beating Angelique and Tactile with Cardigan Bay only sixth from a 48-yard handicap. A record showgrounds crowd of 45,796 attended. In New Zealand and Australia he had raced 67 times for 43 wins, 9 seconds and 3 thirds.

=== Major Australasian wins ===
- 1961 New Zealand Free For All beating Scottish Command and Smokeaway
- 1961 Auckland Pacing Cup, beating King Hal and Samantha
- 1963 Auckland Pacing Cup (handicap of 78 yards), beating Tactile and Vanderford
- 1963 New Zealand Trotting Cup (handicap of 54 yards), beating Robin Dundee and Master Alan
- 1963 New Zealand Free For All, beating Sun Chief and Vanderford
- 1963 Inter Dominion Pacing Championship (handicap of 24 yards) beating Dusty Miller and Waitaki Hanover.

=== In North America ===
Cardigan Bay was taken to the USA at the advanced age of eight, on a "racing lease" to New Jersey reinsman Stanley Dancer and his owners for a payment of $US125,000, even though he had only $US137,000 in earnings up to that point and was "down on the hip" from the severe injury suffered in Perth, Western Australia years earlier. He won many races in the US and Canada and defeated U.S. Champion Overtrick in one of three races. He was the only horse to defeat the three U.S. Hall of Fame horses of that era: Overtrick, Bret Hanover, and Meadow Skipper.

In 1964, Overtrick and Cardigan Bay engaged in two races: The Dan Patch Pace and the Dan Patch Encore. Cardigan Bay prevailed by the shortest of noses in the Dan Patch, and Overtrick won the Encore. Overtrick also defeated Cardigan Bay in an earlier race in 1964, prevailing by a neck in a mile and a half race.

In 1965 Cardigan Bay won the American Pacing Classic at Hollywood Park and the National Pacing Derby and Nassau Pace both at Roosevelt Raceway. At Hollywood Park he led a race over 1 1/16 miles helping to establish a world record for the distance of 2.03 2/5 by the winner Adios Vic. Cardigan Bay finished second after leading through the first mile in 1.56. He also had a win over Adios Vic in 1.57 2/5 which was his fastest time in a race.

April 1966 saw Cardigan Bay sweep all three legs of the International Pacing Series, the International Pace, Good Time Pace and National Championship Pace at Yonkers Raceway. It was the first time a horse had won all three legs. Perhaps his most famous encounter was with the great Standardbred horse, Bret Hanover, in the Pace of the Century, in 1966. Cardigan Bay, with Stanley Dancer driving, won that race in front of 45,000 spectators at Yonkers Raceway and became only one of two horses (the other being Adios Vic) up to that time to have beaten Bret Hanover. However, in their next encounter at Roosevelt Raceway, the "Revenge Pace," Bret Hanover reversed that result with Cardigan Bay third before a crowd of 37,000.

At Hollywood Park he raced in the American Pacing Classic but did not repeat his win of 1965. In his last ever race Bret Hanover set a torrid pace reaching the half mile in 56 seconds and the mile in 1.54 3/5 before tiring. True Duane won with Cardigan Bay finishing second and Bret Hanover third. As in 1965 he finished the year by winning the National Pacing Derby and Nassau Pace.

In 1967 Cardigan Bay won the second ever running of the Provincial Cup at Windsor Raceway which at the time was the richest harness race in Canada. He also won the Washington Park Derby in Chicago.

=== The million dollar pacer ===
By age 12, 1968, Cardigan Bay competed to reach $1 million in earnings. He needed about $85,000 at the start of the year. He won he Provincial Cup for a second time and the James Clark Memorial at Liberty Bell in Philadelphia. In September at Freehold Raceway in New Jersey, he won his last race, surpassing one million dollars. He became a celebrity and appeared on The Ed Sullivan Show with Stanley Dancer and the Beach Boys.

A month after he reached the million dollar mark, it was, by formal proclamation, "Cardigan Bay Day" in Yonkers, New York. The next evening Cardigan Bay walked down a long red carpet, which led into the living rooms of 20 million viewers, on the Ed Sullivan television show. No immigrant had ever "made it any bigger any faster". Dancer immediately retired him, and he was returned to New Zealand with great fanfare with thousands at harbour awaiting his arrival.

Cardigan Bay is possibly the most well-known racehorse ever to come from New Zealand. He won 80 races in all. Much of his racing was done in the United States, where he teamed up with legendary reinsman Stanley Dancer in his many appearances at Yonkers Raceway near New York City. He was the only horse to defeat the three U.S. Hall of Fame horses of that era: Overtrick, Bret Hanover, and Meadow Skipper. He was a Harness Champion in the United States, being Pacer of the Year in 1965 and 1968.

== Tributes ==
Cardigan Bay was an inaugural inductee into the New Zealand Trotting Hall of Fame with the immortals Caduceus, Harold Logan, Highland Fling, Johnny Globe and Ordeal.

Bruce Skeggs, race caller for many years, rated Cardigan Bay, harness racing's first million dollar earner and winner of the 1963 Adelaide Inter Dominion, as the best pacer he ever saw. Skeggs called a world-record 34,000 harness races through a network of radio stations. He broadcast races in ten different countries – Australia, New Zealand, United States of America, Canada, Italy, Sweden, Denmark, Norway, Germany and Macau.

On the horse's death in 1988, Cardigan Bay's driver Stanley Dancer, reflected on the gelding's last year of racing and said, "At the end he was going on heart alone.....what a mighty heart it must have been".

The New Zealand Post Office issued a postage stamp in 1970 to recognise Cardigan Bay's achievements.

== See also ==
- List of racehorses
- Bret Hanover
- Harness racing in Australia
- Harness racing in New Zealand
- New Zealand Trotting Hall of Fame
- Meadow Skipper
- Overtrick
- Stanley Dancer
