= Highland Fling (horse) =

New Zealand Standardbred racehorse

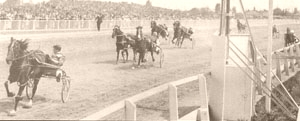
- Highland Fling winning the 1948 New Zealand Trotting Cup with a handicap of 60 yards.
- Breed: Standardbred
- Sire: U Scott (USA)
- Grandsire: Scotland
- Dam: Queen Ayesha
- Maternal grandsire: Frank Worthy (USA)
- Sex: Stallion
- Foaled: 1 September 1942
- Died: June 1975
- Country: New Zealand
- Colour: Bay
- Breeder: K Bare (NZ)
- Owner: A T Kemble (NZ)
- Trainer: L F Berkett (NZ)

Record
- 70 starts: 25 wins, 6 seconds, 4 thirds.

Earnings
- £32,920

Major wins
- 1947 & 1948 New Zealand Trotting Cup; 1948 Premier Sprint Championship; 1948 Rattray Handicap; 1948 Wellington Cup

Honours
- New Zealand Trotting Hall of Fame; New Zealand Mile Record (twice); Mile rate of 1:57.8
- Last updated on: 2009-04-27.

Highland Fling was a New Zealand bred Standardbred racehorse. He is notable in that he won two New Zealand Trotting Cup races, the richest harness race, and sometimes the richest horse race in New Zealand. Highland Fling was a leading performer in the years 1947 and 1948. He won the 1948 New Zealand Trotting Cup with a handicap of 60 yards.

Highland Fling was the winner of the last race he contested. He retired with an unequalled record at the time. Highland Fling not only held the world's two-mile record, and the 2:10 race record as a two-year-old. He bettered 2.00 on three occasions, his best being 1:57.8, and he held the world's grass track record of 2:00 for a mile.

As a two-year-old Highland Fling won the Great Northern Stakes in Auckland on debut in 1945 and also won the Timaru Nursery Stakes. He was second in the Great Northern Derby in 1946 at age three.

As a four-year-old Highland Fling developed bad barrier manners spoiling his chances of winning races and he was transferred to the stables of Leo Berkett who reduced the amount of gear (equipment) that he was wearing. His form improved with Berkett and he won six of his last eleven starts as a four-year-old and he effortlessly won the 1947 New Zealand Trotting Cup by two lengths at age five. In the 1947-48 season Highland Fling also won the Wellington Cup, Otago Free For All and Rattray Handicap and £15,835 for the season which was a record for any horse in New Zealand. In the 1948 Inter Dominion at Alexandra Park he won a heat by 3 lengths on the second day in a time for 3:09.8 which was a New Zealand record for a 1 ½ mile race but he was unplaced in the final won by Emulous.

In 1948-49 Highland Fling won the New Zealand Trotting Cup for a second time, passing Gloaming as the leading stakeswinner in New Zealand for either the thoroughbred or Standardbred breed. His winning time in the Cup of 4:10 3/5 was the fastest two-mile time in the world and he overcame a 60-yard handicap to win. He then raced two separate miles against the clock at Addington. In the first he paced the mile in 1:59 2/5, equalling the Australasian record of Lawn Derby set in 1938, and then in the second mile he established a new record of 1:57 4/5. The quarter-mile times were 29, 58.2 and 1:28.3. On the same day as the second mile time trial, he won the Premier Sprint Championship. In two further time trials he broke the track record at Forbury Park, Dunedin with a 1:58 mile and in February 1949 he paced 2:00 for a mile on grass, a record for a grass track. There was interest from the United States in attracting Highland Fling to race in lucrative races at Hollywood Park, California, but it did not eventuate as the owners preferred to attempt to win a third New Zealand Cup. In April 1949 he beat Captain Sandy at Addington but a broken bone in a leg ended his career.

In his career Highland Fling won 25 races with 6 second- and 4 third-placings from 70 starts and £32,920.

He stood at stud in New South Wales and Victoria where he sired many winners. He died in June 1975.

Highland Fling was an inaugural inductee into the New Zealand Trotting Hall of Fame with the immortals Caduceus, Cardigan Bay, Harold Logan, Johnny Globe and Ordeal.

== See also ==
- Harness racing in New Zealand
