= Galloway pony =

Extinct breed of pony

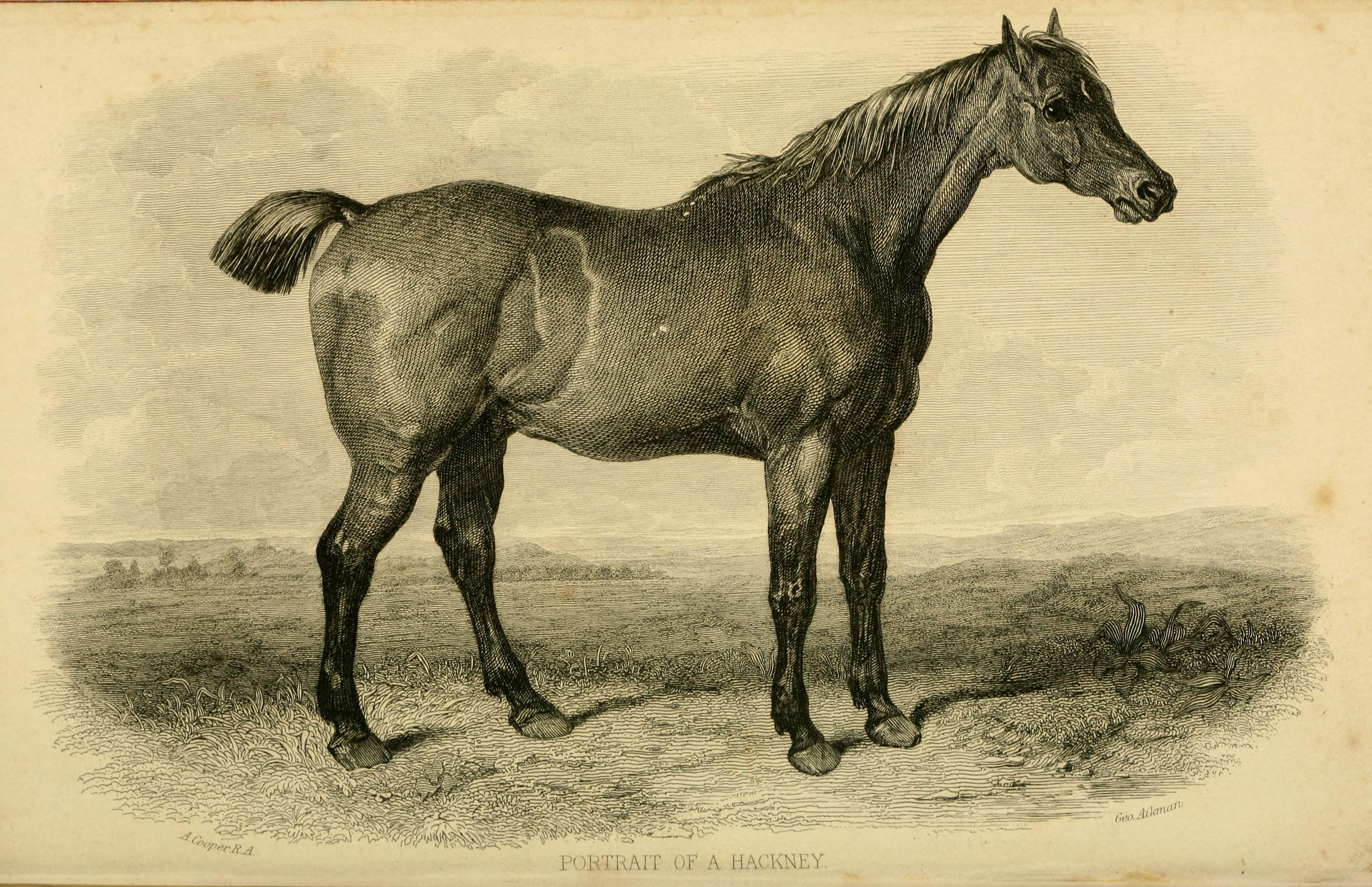
Illustration of a Galloway Pony from 1842.

The Galloway pony is an extinct horse breed, once native to Scotland and northern England. It was said to have "good looks, a wide, deep chest and a tendency to pace rather than trot." In the 18th century Galloways were bred in Swaledale, to haul lead ore.

The breed was mentioned by Shakespeare as "Galloway nags" in Henry IV, Part 2.

"Thrust him down stairs! know we not Galloway nags?" Pistol - Henry IV, Part 2 by William Shakespeare

A survey in 1814 stated:

The province of Galloway formerly possessed a breed of horses peculiar to itself, which were in high estimation for the saddle, being, though of a small size, exceedingly hardy and active. They were larger than the ponies of Wales, and the north of Scotland, and rose from twelve to fourteen hands in height. The soils of Galloway, in their unimproved state, are evidently adapted for rearing such a breed of horses; and in the moors and mountainous part of the country, a few of the native breed are still to be found. … This ancient race is almost lost, since farmers found it necessary to breed horses of greater weight, and better adapted to the draught. But such as have a considerable portion of the old blood, are easily distinguished, by their smallness of head and neck, and cleanness of bone. They are generally of a light bay or brown colour, and their legs black. The name of Galloway is sometimes given to horses of an intermediate size between the poney and the full-sized horse, whatever may be the breed.

The Galloway pony heavily influenced the Newfoundland pony, the Highland Pony, and the Fell pony of England. It died out through crossbreeding because its crossbred progeny were such useful animals, much like the Narragansett Pacer breed of Rhode Island.

In Australia, the term "Galloway" is used to describe horses between 14 and 15 hands (56 and 60 inches, 142 and 152 cm) tall. (Note: the term was also in use in South Africa in the early part of the 20th century)
