= Caduceus (horse) =

New Zealand Standardbred racehorse

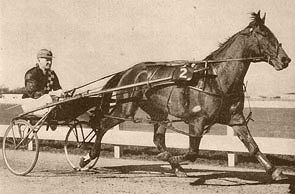
- Breed: Standardbred
- Sire: U Scott (US)
- Grandsire: Scotland
- Dam: Little Ada (NZ)
- Maternal grandsire: Frank Worthy (US)
- Sex: Stallion
- Foaled: 1 September 1950
- Country: New Zealand
- Colour: Bay
- Breeder: DR and DD Moore

Earnings
- US$320,000

Major wins
- 1960 Inter Dominion Pacing Championship; 1959 New Zealand Free For All; 1958 New Zealand Free For All; 1956 New Zealand Free For All; 1954 Auckland Pacing Cup

Honours
- Best winning mile rate 1:57.4
- Last updated on: 2010-01-30.

Caduceus was a New Zealand bred Standardbred racehorse. Caduceus is notable for winning the 1960 Inter Dominion Trotting Championship, trotting's premiership event in Australia and New Zealand, from a handicap of 36 yards, in front of a world record crowd. Prior to this in New Zealand, he had won major events including the New Zealand Free For All sprint race on three occasions plus the Auckland Pacing Cup.

In 1960, he went to the United States, the first to prove he could match the very top US horses. He ended up winning more than £100,000, with gallopers Tulloch and Sailor's Guide as the only horses bred in Australia or New Zealand to have achieved this distinction at that time.

He was an inaugural inductee into the New Zealand Trotting Hall of Fame with the immortals Cardigan Bay, Harold Logan, Highland Fling, Johnny Globe and Ordeal.

== 1960 Inter Dominion ==
The most notable race took place on 13 February 1960 at Harold Park Paceway, Sydney, when the "mighty atom" Caduceus from New Zealand defeated Australia's Apmat in the final of the Inter Dominion before a world record crowd of 50,346. Caduceus and Apmat had been singled out as the best two chances in a star-studded final field, and throughout the heat series, it could be seen that the rivalry which existed between these two horses had been carried on to their jockeys Jack Litten of New Zealand on Caduceus, and the local champion, Bert Alley on Apmat.

The race was viewed by a large number of spectators who had positioned themselves at every available location, including the inside greyhound circuit, which is now the centre-course car park, where the crowd was particularly dense. Some individuals who were unable to obtain a clear view of the proceedings from the grandstand dismantled timber and three ply partitions in the main grandstand. Caduceus emerged victorious at the finish line, coming in half a length ahead of Apmat, with Maestro's Melody from Victoria following closely in third place and Fettle coming in fourth. The thunderous applause that greeted Caduceus was interrupted by the announcement of a protest lodged by Bert Alley, contesting the horse's victory. This elicited an unexpected negative response from the crowd, which was particularly surprising given that Caduceus was a local horse. Nonetheless, the Stewards dismissed the protest, and Caduceus emerged as the winner of one of the most eventful sporting events ever to take place in Sydney.

== United States ==
In 1960, aged nine, Caduceus went to the United States to compete in the annual Yonkers Raceway International Series. Caduceus showed he was just as good as the top American horses, even winning the last race of the series, only to be disqualified. He was then leased to American interests, and at 10 years was still winning races. He won 82 races before he was returned to New Zealand and sired 18 winners before his early death after only two seasons at stud.

== Major races ==
- 1st in the 1954 Auckland Pacing Cup beating Bartender and Goldina
- 3rd in the 1956 New Zealand Trotting Cup behind Thunder and Laureldale
- 1st in the 1956 New Zealand Free For All beating Johnny Globe and Thelma Globe
- 2nd in the 1958 New Zealand Trotting Cup behind False Step with Gentry 3rd
- 1st in the 1958 New Zealand Free For All beating Gentry and Tactician
- 3rd in the 1959 New Zealand Trotting Cup behind False Step and Gentry
- 1st in the 1959 New Zealand Free For All beating Gentry and False Step
- 1st in the 1960 Inter Dominion Pacing Championship at Harold Park beating Apmat and Maestro's Melody

== See also ==
- Harness racing in New Zealand
- Harness racing in Australia
- Harness racing
