= SeedChange =

Non-profit organization

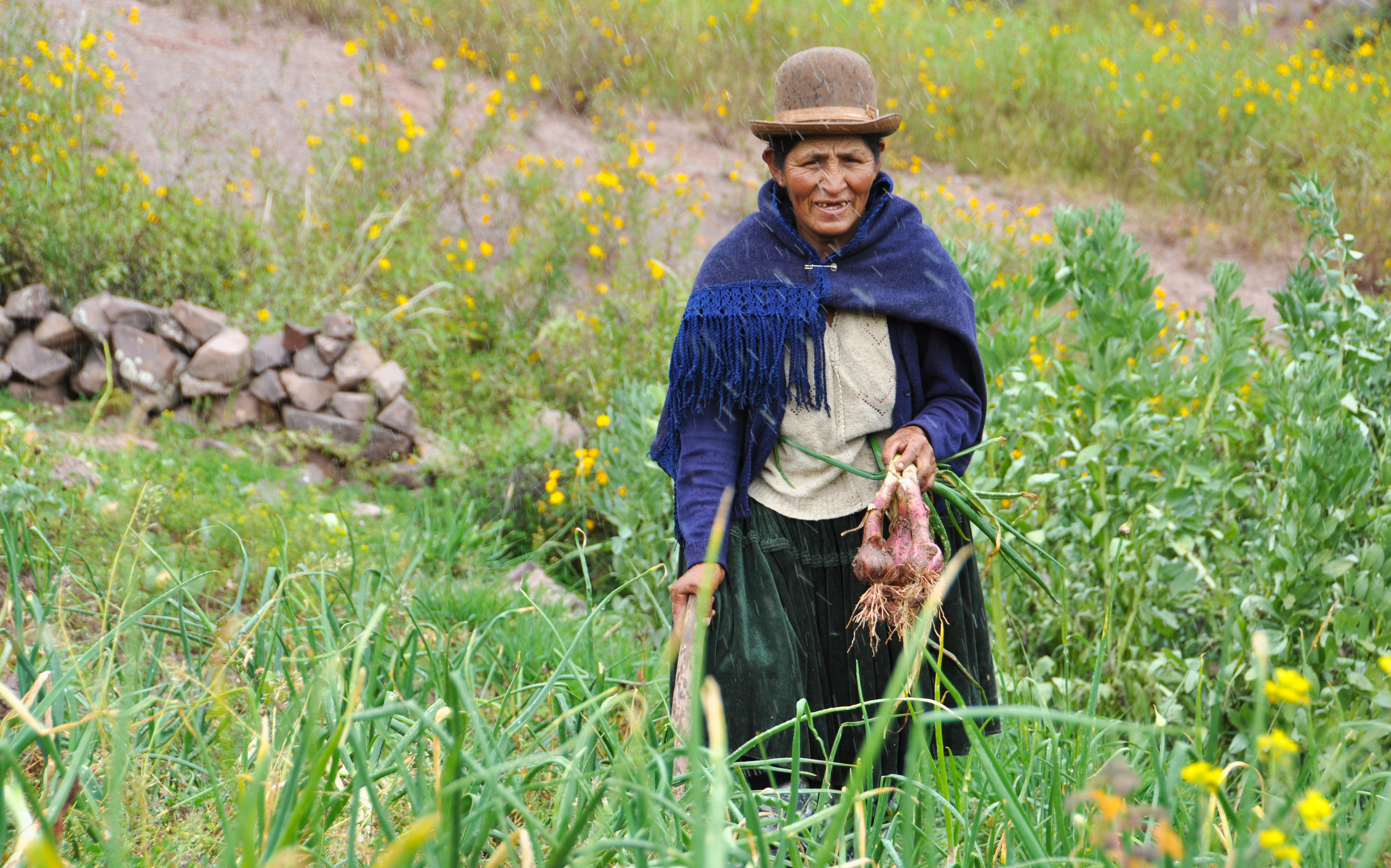
Sebastiana Montan is a small-scale farmer in Panacachi, Bolivia who works with SeedChange. (Photo: Kath Clark/SeedChange)

SeedChange (French: Sème l'avenir), formerly known as USC Canada, is a non-profit organization that works with farmers around the world, including in Canada, to strengthen their ability to grow food sustainably with locally adapted seeds. The organization was founded in 1945 by Lotta Hitschmanova as the Unitarian Service Committee of Canada. It updated its name in October 2019, a few months short of its 75th year.

The mission of SeedChange is to build food sovereignty by working with partners to enhance biodiversity, promote ecological agriculture and counter inequity. Its work serves to help farmers build and maintain strong rural communities thanks to resilient family farms and healthy ecosystems. The organization partners with other non-profit organizations in Africa, Asia, and Latin America to design and deliver programs to help farmers strengthen biodiversity, food sovereignty, and realize their rights. SeedChange also works to influence global food production policies that protect farmers' rights and nurture fertile landscapes, regenerating the water, soils and vegetation that humans, plants, and animals depend on.

As of 2019, the organization is run by a staff of approximately 25, most of whom are based in Ottawa, Canada.

The organization's award-winning flagship program, Seeds of Survival, was featured in a National Geographic article in July 2011.

== History ==
SeedChange was founded as the Unitarian Service Committee of Canada in 1945 by Lotta Hitschmanova, a Czech refugee who had fled the Nazi occupation in Europe and was determined to help victims of war rebuild their lives. The organization received its registered charity status on August 30 of that year. The committee recruited Canada’s first female senator, Carine Wilson, as an honorary chairperson, hoping she could help the largely female committee break through the layers of bureaucracy.

Dr. Lotta Hitchmanova was not a Unitarian herself, but she had received help from the Unitarian Service Committee of Boston during the early years of World War II in France. A few years after her arrival in Canada as a refugee, she decided to turn to the Unitarians once more for support in launching her organization. The Unitarian Service Committee of Canada severed its formal ties to its sister organization, the Unitarian Service Committee of Boston, in 1948. The organization has been financially independent and non-denominational organization ever since. Still, ties with Unitarian communities and volunteers across Canada remained strong for decades, and still continue today.

Hitschmanova served as Executive Director for nearly 40 years, retiring in 1982. Throughout her career, the organization's work expanded from Europe to other conflict zones and developing countries around the world, wherever the need was greatest. Through Public Service Announcements on television and radio, Dr. Hitschmanova became one of Canada's most recognized humanitarians and public figures. Her distinctive Czech accent as she pronounced USC Canada's address, 56 Sparks Street, Ottawa, became an unforgettable signature. She struck a special chord with Canadians and mobilized a whole generation to take action and help.

The organization's name was officially changed to USC Canada in the early 2000s, and then updated to SeedChange in 2019.

== Present Day ==
Today, SeedChange continues to be an organization rooted in the notions of human dignity and equality. It focuses on sustainable farming (through agroecology and locally-adapted) as a means to improve the lives of disadvantaged farmers in Global South communities, as well as a means to address biodiversity loss, climate change, and health and justice concerns related to the food system.

In 2013, SeedChange (then USC Canada) partnered with Seeds of Diversity Canada to start Bauta Family Initiative on Canadian Seed Security. This initiative is building a movement for resilient seed systems across Canada. Working with farmers, seed producers, researchers, and partners from civil society, government and business, the program conserves and advances biodiversity, maintains public access to seed, delivers research and training programs on ecological seed production, and promotes the wisdom and knowledge of farmers.
