= Ordeal (horse) =

New Zealand Standardbred racehorse

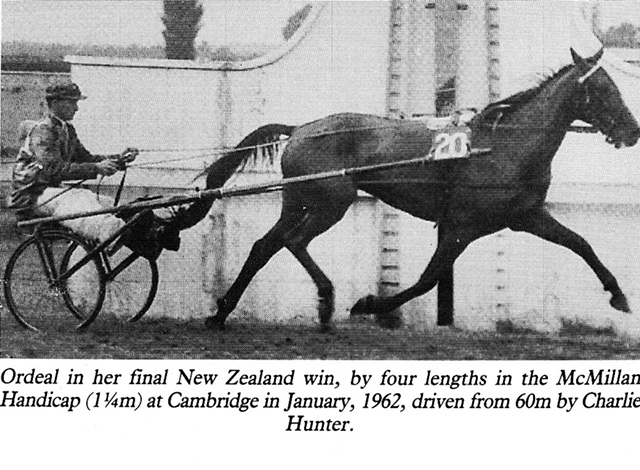
- Breed: Standardbred
- Sire: Light Brigade (USA)
- Grandsire: Volomite
- Dam: Arizona (NZ)
- Maternal grandsire: U Scott
- Sex: Mare
- Foaled: 1 September 1957
- Country: New Zealand
- Colour: Bay
- Breeder: Arthur Nicholl
- Owner: Mrs L M & W A Bradley
- Trainer: F G Holmes

Earnings
- $67,063

Major wins
- 1960 Dominion Handicap; 1961 Rowe Cup

Honours
- New Zealand Trotting Hall of Fame inductee
- Last updated on: 24 October 2011.

Ordeal was a New Zealand Standardbred racemare. A notable achievement was winning the Rowe Cup, the top event in New Zealand for trotting horses. Ordeal was considered the top trotter in New Zealand in the 1960s, but had moderate success in the United States. She was the first ever trotter to break the 2:00 mile barrier in New Zealand.

Ordeal won the following major races:

- 1960 Dominion Handicap (Handicap of 12 yards)
- 1961 Rowe Cup

She was an inaugural inductee into the New Zealand Trotting Hall of Fame with the immortals Caduceus, Cardigan Bay, Harold Logan, Highland Fling and Johnny Globe.

== See also ==
- Harness racing
- Harness racing in New Zealand
