= Lac La Croix Pony =

North American horse breed developed by the Ojibwe people

Lac La Croix pony
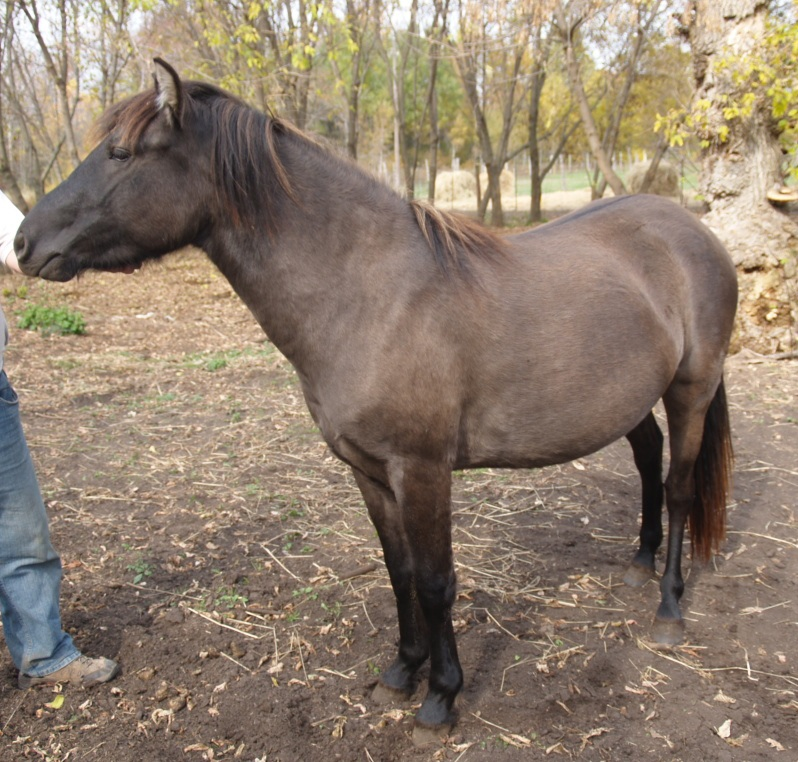
- Lac La Croix mare
- Other names: LLCIP, Lac La Croix Indigenous pony, Lac La Croix Indian pony, Ojibwe pony, bebezhigooganzhii, mishdatim
- Country of origin: Canada

Traits
- Height: 122 to 147 centimetres (12.0 to 14.2 hands; 48 to 58 in)
- Colour: Any solid color except white or cream dilutions

The Ojibwe Horse, also known as the Lac La Croix Indian Pony (bebezhigooganzhii, mishdatim) and Lac La Croix “Indian” or “Indigenous” pony is a semi-feral Canadian horse breed developed by the Ojibwe people. The population became critically low; and, by 1977, only four mares remained. To preserve the breed, these mares were crossed with Spanish Mustang stallions. The modern breed name derives from the Lac La Croix First Nation of Ontario, where the horses were last found in the wild. Historically, the breed was also found in Minnesota.

Today, it remains a critically endangered breed; there are about 200 horses located in Ontario, Saskatchewan, Manitoba, Alberta, and British Columbia in Canada, as well as Minnesota and Wisconsin in the United States. The breed registry is maintained by the Ojibwe Horse Society, a registered Canadian not-for-profit.

== Characteristics ==
The Ojibwe Horse is a small riding horse standing 122 to 147 centimetres (12.0 to 14.2 hands; 48 to 58 in) high. The breed is seen in any solid color except white and cream dilutions. Black and bay are common, as are dun shades with primitive markings. They are hardy, with smooth-flowing gaits, and a reputation for being gentle and intelligent. It is considered the only breed matured by indigenous people in Canada.

The breed has a broad forehead tapering to a refined muzzle. They have cold weather adaptations including small, well-haired ears and nostril flaps able to tighten in bad weather. They have low withers, a short, straight back, sloping croup and a low-set tail. Their cannon bones are heavy and strong. Their mane and tail is thick.

=== Genetics ===
Ojibwe Horses were believed to be a landrace cross of Canadian horse and Spanish Colonial horse or Mustang breeding. However, this proved to be incorrect by later genetic studies. These original horses declined to the point that by 1977 only four mares remained, at which time their bloodlines were crossed with Spanish Mustang stallions. Blood-typing studies conducted by Gus Cothran at the University of Kentucky indicate that the ponies have British pony ancestry as well as some Iberian horse markers. They are classified as an indigenous horse breed of Canada, but are at risk of a genetic bottleneck. A 2011 study found they had the second-lowest average effective number of alleles and allelic richness (2.83 and 4.01) among several breeds of pony breeds found in Canada. A 2012 study of matrilineal genetics verified Nordic horse and British pony breed ancestry, with Iberian origins indicated but more difficult to verify on account of modern Spanish Mustang crossbreeding.

== History ==
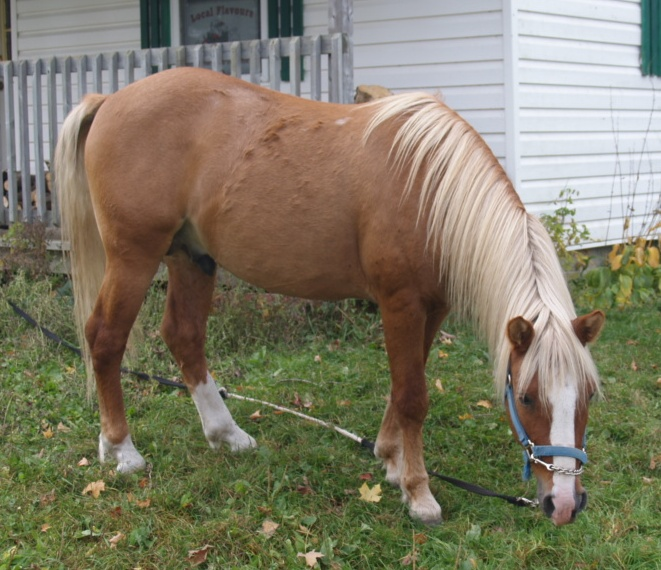
A Lac La Croix stallion

The Ojibwe Horse breed developed in the Great Lakes transboundary region of southern Canada and the northern United States. The original pony was a multi-purpose working animal, of particular importance to the Ojibwe people in the winter. The breed was ridden along trap lines, pulled loads of ice and wood, and hauled sleighs. At the end of the winter, people herded some of the ponies over lake ice to an isolated location called "Pony Island" to keep them safe during foaling and breeding season. There they were allowed to run loose in a semi-feral condition until the following winter. Others freely crossed the border between Ontario and Minnesota.

By 1900, the ponies were relatively plentiful, with an estimated population of a few thousand, found in many of the First Nation reserves in the area. The horse population declined during the 20th century for many reasons. In the early 20th century, indigenous people were prohibited by the government from leaving their Reserves without a permit, and so taking away their horses further limited their movement. Lack of transportation also reduced their land base, allowing settlement by whites. Some horses taken away from the Ojibwe people were rendered into glue and horsemeat. When Quetico Provincial Park was created in 1913, many Indigenous people—and presumably their horses—were forcibly removed. Free-roaming horses were particularly at risk, as they did not have caretakers watching over them. Later in the century, mechanization played a role as motor vehicles, including the snowmobile, replaced the horse.

The last population in the United States, located at the Bois Forte Indian Reservation in Minnesota, was killed off in the 1940s. Missionaries at the reservation decided it was inappropriate for children to witness the sight of semi-feral horses in the act of mating. The last Canadian community to keep their horses was the Lac La Croix First Nation. By the 1960s, when someone accidentally shot a colt who was the last remaining male of breeding age, there were six horses left, including one elderly stallion that was unable to breed. In 1977, the Canadian government claimed the four remaining mares a public nuisance. Before officials could destroy them, the Bois Forte and the Lac La Croix planned a rescue. They loaded the mares into a horse trailer, and Fred Isham, an Ojibwe from Nett Lake, drove them to Minnesota. There they lived in a free-roaming state on a farm, protected from slaughter.

Because there were no remaining stallions, a registered Spanish Mustang known as Smokey SMR 169 was bred to the mares. The first male foal, named Keokuk, was born in January 1980. Another colt, Nimkii, was foaled in 1985. These two stallions founded the modern Lac La Croix bloodlines.

In the 1990s, the Lac La Croix Indian Pony was categorized as a rare breed; it was listed as "endangered" by the Food and Agriculture Organization of the United Nations in 2007, and in 2020 was reported to DAD-IS as "at risk". It remains on the livestock conservation list of Heritage Livestock Canada. Today, there are about 150 horses located in Ontario, Saskatchewan, Alberta, Minnesota, and Wisconsin. In 2012, scientists recommended a conservation strategy be developed for the Eriskay pony and the Lac La Croix, based upon the need to preserve their unique genetics.

== Uses and welfare ==
The modern Ojibwe Horse is considered a spirit animal by the Ojibwe people and is used in programs promoting indigenous heritage. Other uses include equine-assisted therapy and tourism. In particular, they are used to help indigenous youth remain in touch with their heritage.

In the 2000s, Dr. Kimberlee Campbell, a Harvard professor, and her partner Darcy Whitecrow, a Seine River First Nation member, founded Grey Raven Ranch, a nonprofit dedicated to the survival of the Ojibwe Horse and their connection to Ojibwe people. Since founding the organization, they have done countless education events and have written a children's book about the Ojibwe Horse.

In 2022, Dr. Em Loerzel, an American woman and a registered descendent of the White Earth Nation (Minnesota Chippewa Tribe, Ojibwe), brought six Ojibwe Horses from Ontario and back to Wisconsin. They are now cared for by Loerzel and her nonprofit, "The Humble Horse". The organization works to reconnect the Ojibwe Horse to Anishinaabe communities.

== See also ==
- Pony
- List of horse breeds
- Sorraia
