= Lotta Hitschmanova =

Canadian humanitarian (1909–1990)

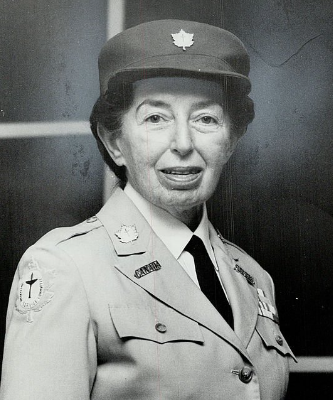
- Born: Lotte Hitschmann; November 28, 1909; Prague, Bohemia
- Died: August 1, 1990 (aged 80); Ottawa, Ontario, Canada
- Known for: Humanitarian aid

Lotta Hitschmanova, CC (November 28, 1909 – August 1, 1990) was a Canadian humanitarian. In 1945, she helped to found the Unitarian Service Committee of Canada (now called SeedChange), an international development organization consisting of a small group of aid workers sending supplies to war-torn Europe for relief and reconstruction.

Attired in an army nurse's uniform and military-style hat, she traveled yearly to strife-torn and poverty-stricken parts of the world searching out towns and villages in need of Canadian assistance to recover from drought, war, disease and poverty.

== Early life ==
Hitschmanova was born Lotte Hitschmann in Prague, Bohemia (now Czech Republic), on November 28, 1909, to Maximilian ("Max") Hitschmann and Else Theiner. She had a younger sister named Lilly born fifteen months later. The family was of Czech Jewish descent. Their father was a malt merchant with factories located beyond Prague's suburbs. The family lived in moderate wealth and comfort. She attended a co-educational high school Stephans Gymnasium where she graduated with honours. In 1929 she enrolled in the school of Philosophy at the University of Prague where she excelled at languages earning diplomas in Czech, German, English, French, and Spanish. In 1932 she went to Paris where she studied political science and journalism at the Sorbonne. While at the Sorbonne institute she obtained diplomas in journalism and French studies. In 1935 she returned to Prague to work as a freelance journalist. She also completed her PhD at Prague University.

She worked for several newspapers (e.g. the French written Romanian newspaper L'Indépendance Roumaine) (see below) as well as the Yugoslavian government news agency. Her writings reflected her anti-Nazi sentiments. When the Germans seized a third of Czechoslovakia following the Munich Agreement of September 30, 1938 she left the country and returned to Paris. She eventually ended up in Brussels, Belgium. At this time she changed her last name to the Slavic variation Hitschmanova which sounded less like German.

== War years ==
In Belgium, Dr. Hitschmanova worked as a journalist, but when the Germans invaded that country she escaped to France, eventually ending up in Marseille, where she was able to obtain employment with an immigration service that assisted refugees. One day, while queuing in Marseille's market over lunch hour, she fainted from fatigue and hunger. After regaining consciousness, Hitschmanova made her way to a medical clinic run by the Boston-based Unitarian Service Committee. This, says her biographer, Clyde Sanger, was her first contact with the organization. She became even more familiar with it in January 1942 when she was appointed liaison officer with the Czechoslovak relief agency, Centre d'Aide Tchécoslovaque, but not until 1945 would the USC become her life's major work and mission.

In 1942, Lotta was able to escape from Europe by sailing from Lisbon to New York on a refugee-packed twin-screw steamer designed to carry bananas rather than passengers. After delivering a USC report to Boston, she quickly departed for Canada, which, unlike the United States, had granted her a visa. Lotta later said she reached Montreal "exhausted, with a feeling of absolute solitude in an entirely strange country ... I came with $60 in my pocket. I had an unpronounceable name. I weighed less than 100 lbs, and I was completely lost."

She was not lost for long, for on her fourth day in Canada she managed to obtain a secretarial job with a Montreal firm. Within three months she was in Ottawa working as a postal censor for the Department of War Services. She joined the Czechoslovak National Alliance and helped raise money for Czech War Services in London, England. She also worked briefly for the United Nations Relief and Rehabilitation Administration. After the war ended, Hitschmanova was offered several jobs including one involving the rehabilitation of children in Czechoslovakia. When she learned that her parents had perished in a holding camp en route to the Auschwitz concentration camp she decided to stay in Canada. She found that her sister Lilly had moved to Israel and later on, Lilly relocated to Canada.

== Unitarian Service Committee ==
In June 1945, Lotta helped to organize the Canadian branch of the Unitarian Service Committee. She was named as the first chairperson and she served in this position until 1949. The committee was affiliated with the Unitarian Church in Canada and the American Unitarian Association in Boston. In 1948 it severed its official link with the Unitarians and became an independent organization. However, it retained close ties with the Unitarians for many years as well as the word Unitarian in its name. In 2019 the organization updated its name to SeedChange—or in French Sème l'avenir—in order to reflect both the organization's mission and history, and to provide a more memorable name for new generations of supporters.

Its initial objective was the relief of distressed people in France and Czechoslovakia. Senator Cairine Wilson was made honorary chairman, but Hitschmanova, who filled the position of executive director, was the driving force behind the organization. On August 29, 1945, USC Canada was registered under the War Charities Act. At first it was only allowed to raise money from Unitarians but in February 1946 the appeal was extended to all Canadians.

In the spring of 1946, she set off on a three-month tour of western Canada to tell audiences about the hunger and destitution in other countries, to furnish particulars about how Canadian contributions in previous years had been employed, and to appeal for funds and clothing. On her trip, she raised $40,000 and collected 30,000 kg of clothing. In the summer of 1946 she travelled to Europe to assess conditions and after that, she recommended that the organization focus on physically disabled children. Canadians sent food, money and prosthetic limbs for injured children. Through Hitschmanova's direction, USC Canada started a foster parent program. Canadians could sponsor a child for which they would receive a photo and a story.

In 1949 Hitschmanova advised the USC to switch its efforts to Italy and Greece. USC's role in these two countries lasted until 1979. In 1950, USC expanded its programs to other parts of the world. From the early 1950s to the late 1970s, Korea was a major recipient of relief funds. USC Canada also set up programs in 20 other countries including India, Nepal, Vietnam, Lesotho, and Indonesia.

During this period, she entered a routine of three months spent fund-raising in Canada and four months spent overseas to supervise USC Canada programs. She always travelled in her uniform that had become her trademark. This home-made creation of Hitschmanova's was modeled on the outfit worn by American army nurses – olive-green for winter and khaki for summer. Both versions had the word 'Canada' stitched onto the lapel along with badges from the USC. While she never served in any army, Hitschmanova created the uniform because at the time UN workers were required to wear an identifiable uniform. She found the outfit comfortable to wear and made for a light travelling wardrobe. and allowed her to more easily cross borders and access refugee camps. Her uniform has been preserved at the Canadian War Museum and has been featured at the Canadian Museum of Immigration at Pier 21 to highlight her work with refugees (2014).

During her fund-raising drives, Hitschmanova made appeals on radio and television. Thanks to her own journalism background, Hitschmanova knew what was needed to make a story and used this expertise to full advantage. Reporters and editors dubbed her "The Atomic Mosquito" because of her continuing success in getting good media coverage. The USC produced an annual film that portrayed her on her travels to inspect various projects. In 1972, the USC made a film called the USC Story created from film clips of the past 25 years. In 1970, Hitschmanova wrote a book entitled The USC Story: A Quarter Century of Loving Service by the Unitarian Service Committee about her experiences working for USC Canada.

Through her fundraising efforts, between 1945 and 1984 the USC raised a total of $128,855,000.

== Honours ==
Throughout the years, Dr. Hitschmanova received many awards, including the Gold Medal from the Cross of France (1950) and the Medal of St. Paul from Greece (1952). Other awards included the Canadian Centennial Medal; the Queen Elizabeth II Silver Jubilee Medal; the Republic of Korea: Order of Civil Merit; Médaille de la Reconnaissance française; United Nations Headquarters Medal and the Decoration for Order and Peace, 1945-1949 from the Netherlands. These medals added rows of ribbons to her famous home-made uniform. In 1968 she was made an Officer of the Order of Canada and was promoted to Companion in 1979. Dr. Lotta, as she was known, became a symbol of personal dedication, and made the Unitarian Service Committee at its well-publicised address of 56 Sparks Street, Ottawa, Ontario, a household name through her numerous radio and television ads.

In 1982 she retired from her position as Executive Director due to ill health. Although she spent the final years of her life suffering from Alzheimer's disease, she succumbed to cancer. She died August 1, 1990.

== Legacy ==
USC Canada, now called SeedChange, continues to operate in Ottawa at 56 Sparks Street. Since the early 2000s, SeedChange has been focusing its work on small-scale farmers in 12 countries, including Canada. Today, the mission of SeedChange is to "build food sovereignty by working with partners to enhance biodiversity, promote ecological food systems, and counter inequity." The organization does this by focusing on activities that build food and livelihood security for small-scale farmers and preserve the agricultural biodiversity necessary to feeding a growing and changing planet.

Vernon Burrows, a renowned scientist specializing in oat research, named one of his new varieties after Hitschmanova. The variety called ACLotta contains a day-length insensitive gene which allows the plant to flower in countries with shorter days. In 2002, USC Canada created the Lotta Hitschmanova Endowment Fund, which will collect money from bequests and donated securities. Its earnings will be used to support USC Canada's programs such as Seeds of Survival.

In 2001, it was revealed that the Royal Canadian Mounted Police had spied on Hitschmanova for 30 years ending in 1977. The RCMP, who during the Cold War had targeted various people and organizations, believed that Hitschmanova, as a Czech refugee, may have been sympathetic to Communism.

In 2020, Hitschmanova was one of eight finalists for the $5 polymer bills in Canada.

== Articles published as Lotte Hitschmann ==
- Précisions sur le statut des nationalités. In: L'Indépendance Roumaine 25.06.1938 (N. 18’986), 1-2;
- Négociations au sujet du statut des nationalités. In: L'Indépendance Roumaine 03.07.1938 (N. 18’992), 1;
- Le statut des nationalités. In: L'Indépendance Roumaine 07.07.1938 (N. 18’995), 1;
- Modifications nationalitaires en Tchécoslovaquie. In: L'Indépendance Roumaine 20.07.1938 (N. 19’005), 3;
- L'Europe et le problème des nationalités en Tchécoslovaquie. In: L'Indépendance Roumaine 21.07.1938 (N. 19'006), 2;
- Lettre de Prague. In: L'Indépendance Roumaine 24.07.1938 (N. 19'009), 1;
- Problèmes de la Tchécoslovaquie. In: L'Indépendance Roumaine 28.07.1938 (N. 19'012), 1;
- Nouvelles économiques de Tchécoslovaquie. In: L'Indépendance Roumaine 23.07.1938 (N. 19'013), 1;
- Négociations sur les questions nationalitaires. In: L'Indépendance Roumaine 09.08.1938 (N. 19’021), 1;
- Pour conjurer la catastrophe. In: L'Indépendance Roumaine 31.08.1938 (N. 19’039), 1;
- De Prague à Cheb. In: L'Indépendance Roumaine 20.09.1938 (N. 19’055), 1;
- Prague reste héroïquement ferme. In: L'Indépendance Roumaine 24.09.1938 (N. 19’059), 1;
- Le nouveau gouvernement tchécoslovaque. In: L'Indépendance Roumaine 09.10.1938 (N. 19’072), 1;
- L’histoire seule jugera. In: L'Indépendance Roumaine 13.10.1938 (N. 19’075), 1-2;
- "Ma Vlast - Ma Patrie". In: L'Indépendance Roumaine 18.10.1938 (N. 19’079), 1;

== Articles published as Lotte Hitschmannova ==
- Lettre de Prague: Ce que nos amis peuvent faire pour nous. In: L'Indépendance Roumaine 20.10.1938 (N. 19’081), 1-2;
- La nouvelle constitution tchécoslovaque. In: L'Indépendance Roumaine 27.10.1938 (N. 19’087), 1;
- Aspects tchécoslovaques. In: L'Indépendance Roumaine 30.10.1938 (N. 19’090), 1;
- Lettre de Prague. In: L'Indépendance Roumaine 03.11.1938 (N. 19’093), 1-2;
- Un grand ami de la Tchécoslovaquie est mort. In: L'Indépendance Roumaine 09.11.1938 (N. 19’098), 3;
- Une semaine décisive. In: L'Indépendance Roumaine 20.11.1938 (N. 19’108), 1;
- Liège 1939. In: L'Indépendance Roumaine 04.04.1939 (N. 19’214), 1 (marked as sent from Brussels);
- L’art contemporain belge. In: L'Indépendance Roumaine 19.04.1939 (N. 19’224), 1;
- Le centenaire du Grand-Duché de Luxembourg. In: L'Indépendance Roumaine 30.04.1939 (N. 19’234), 1;
- L’unité fait la force. In: L'Indépendance Roumaine 03.05.1939 (N. 19’235), 1;
- En flânant dans Bruxelles. In: L'Indépendance Roumaine 24.05.1939 (N. 19’251), 1-2;
- Le problème du bilinguisme en Belgique. In: L'Indépendance Roumaine 25.05.1939 (N. 19’252), 1;
- Les Beaux-Arts à Liège. In: L'Indépendance Roumaine 06.06.1939 (N. 19’261), 1;
- La grande exposition Hans Memling à Bruges. In: L'Indépendance Roumaine 27.06.1939 (N. 19’278), 1;
- Autour du droit de vote des femmes belges. In: L'Indépendance Roumaine 01.07.1939 (N. 19’281), 1;
- Le programme financier du gouvernement belge. In: L'Indépendance Roumaine 08.07.1939 (N. 19’287);
- Nouvelles acquisitions des Musées belges. In: L'Indépendance Roumaine 12.07.1939 (N. 19’290);
- L’aviation militaire belge. In: L'Indépendance Roumaine 23.07.1939 (N. 19’299);
- Les pénitents de Furnes. In: L'Indépendance Roumaine 06.08.1939 (N. 19’311), 1;
- La situation politique en Belgique. In: L'Indépendance Roumaine 23.08.1939 (N. 19’324), 1;
- Les fastes de Bruges. In: L'Indépendance Roumaine 24.08.1939 (N. 19’325);
- Un émouvant appel en faveur de la paix. In: L'Indépendance Roumaine 30.08.1939 (N. 19’330);
- Le cabinet d’Union nationale en Belgique. In: L'Indépendance Roumaine 13.09.1939 (N. 19’342), 1;
- La neutralité de la Belgique. In: L'Indépendance Roumaine 20.09.1939 (N. 19’347).

== Bibliography ==
- Hyam, Grace (July 2006) [2001]. "Foreign-Aid Worker and Humanitarian Lotta Hitschmanova and the Unitarian Service Committee of Canada". In Cook, Sharon Anne; McLean, Lorna R.; O'Rourke, Kate (eds.). Framing our past: Canadian women's history in the twentieth century. Montreal: McGill-Queen's University Press. pp. 417–22. ISBN 978-0-7735-3159-8.
- Sanger, Clyde (1986). Lotta and the Unitarian Service Committee story. Stoddard. ISBN 0773720723.
- Schulman, Frank (May 2004). This Day in Unitarian Universalist History: A Treasury of Anniversaries and Milestones from 600 Years of Religious Tradition. Boston: Skinner House Books. p. 205. ISBN 1-55896-466-5.
