= New Zealand Trotting Hall of Fame =

Hall of fame for New Zealand harness racing

- Location: Formerly Alexandra Park, Epsom, Auckland, New Zealand
- President: Gilbert Myles

The New Zealand Trotting Hall of Fame is an organisation created to recognise and honour those whose achievements have enriched the New Zealand Harness racing industry.

== History ==
In 1969, Noel Taylor, who was President of the Auckland Trotting Club from 1984–89, gifted $650,000 to help set up the museum.

Efforts to establish a trotting museum began in 1969 by Alby Douglas and the Auckland Trotting Club President at the time, Reg Lewis. A small tote building in the Derby area was converted into a museum and was officially opened in 1970 by Allan Highet, the Member of Parliament for Remuera.

In 1985 the museum moved to the larger totalisator building behind the Alexandra Stand, with the inclusion of a library and a section devoted to the Harness Cadet Scheme.

The current museum building was officially opened by Taylor on 19 December 1997. The Hall Of Fame had an agreement with the Auckland Trotting Club to operate there for the peppercorn rental of $1 a year, with no termination date.

Included in the collection is:

- the first Auckland Trotting Cup won by Commodore in 1890
- the framed racing silks of Monte Carlo, the winner of the first New Zealand Trotting Cup in 1904
- a cart used by champion pacer Young Quinn winner of the 1974 Auckland Trotting Cup and 1975 Inter Dominion Pacing Championship
- a cart used by Ces Donald, winning trainer/driver of New Zealand and Auckland Trotting cups
- tributes to Cardigan Bay, who is buried behind the building
- tributes to Delightful Lady
- valuable gold and silver cups, books, journals and newspapers.

Individuals who have made major contributions to the museum include the late Les Callander, Neville Southey and Bill Moat, who worked with a small group of volunteers to develop the exhibits and to show people around the displays.

The first group of honorees were inducted in 1998. The hall and museum is located at Alexandra Park in Auckland.

The museum has transferred 1200 race meetings from film on to disk for visitors to view.

In November 2022 it was reported that the museum is set to be disestablished at Alexandra Park to make way for commercial opportunities, leaving the museum memorabilia without a home.

== Horses inducted ==
=== Inaugural inductees (1998) ===
- Caduceus
- Cardigan Bay
- Harold Logan
- Highland Fling
- Johnny Globe
- Ordeal

=== Other inductees ===
- Delightful Lady
- Easton Light
- Great Evander
- Petite Evander
- Young Quinn

== See also ==
- Harness racing in New Zealand
- New Zealand Horse of the Year
- Harness racing
