= Kent Whealy =

Americnan activist (1946–2018)

- Born: April 27, 1946; Sioux Falls, South Dakota, United States
- Died: March 23, 2018 (aged 71)
- Education: University of Kansas
- Occupations: Philanthropist, Activist
- Spouse: Dianne Ott (m. 1973–2004)

Kent Whealy (April 27, 1946 – March 23, 2018) was an American activist, journalist and philanthropist who co-founded Seed Savers Exchange and promoted organic agriculture and the saving of heirloom seeds. Raised in Wellington, Kansas he was inspired by the works of agricultural geneticists Jack Harlan and H.Garrison Wilkes to use his training in communications to promote the protection of genetic diversity in agriculture.

== Career ==
Kent Whealy graduated from the University of Kansas in 1969 with a degree in journalism. He started a family garden in 1975 which through various land acquisitions he helped developed into the Heritage Farm six miles north of Decorah, Iowa growing nearly 2,000 varieties of vegetables.

In 1990, Whealy received a Fellowship from the MacArthur Fellows Program for his work in agriculture. Whealy was also awarded the N. I. Vavilov medal from the Vavilov Institute in St. Petersburg. In 1981, Kent Whealy first used the word 'heirloom' in regard to seeds, using it to describe beans that his friend gave him.

=== Seed Savers Exchange ===
Whealy co-founded Seed Savers Exchange, Inc. in 1975, with then wife Diane Ott publishing an annual yearbook identifying heirloom seed varieties available for sale in North America. The organization evolved into a private seed bank, collecting and saving heirloom varieties of vegetable, fruit and grain seeds. In 1985, the group extended its reach to include maintaining an ancient rare breed of White Park cattle. Whealy left Seed Savers board in 2007. By the time of his split with the organization Whealy and then former wife Dianne Ott were credited with helping to create one of the largest nongovernmental seed banks with more than 25,000 varieties.

=== Ceres Trust ===
In 2009 Whealy became a trustee with the Ceres Trust. Via the Ceres Trust Whealy funds research and advocacy campaigns in support of organic agriculture. Their initiatives include academic research and consumer education campaigns including funding for the production and promotion of documentaries including Sandra Steingraber's movie Living Downstream on the dangers of pesticides and The Vanishing of the Bees on the role pesticides play in Colony Collapse Disorder, and other advocacy in partnership in support of organic agriculture with the Pesticide Action Network advocacy group.

=== JAK KAW Press ===
In 2015 Kent Whealy formed his own publishing company (JAK KAW Press, LLC) to ensure that Dan Bussey's extensive research on apples and the appropriate pomological watercolors are recorded for posterity.

=== Advocacy ===
Whealy was an outspoken supporter of organic agriculture and the Slow Food movement and critic of pesticides and genetically modified crops calling their use "immoral." In 2012, he was listed among the largest financial donors in support of a California ballot initiative campaign to label foods derived from genetically engineered plants and animals.

== Bibliography ==
- Whealy, Kent; Fearing Burr (1988). The Field and Garden Vegetables of America. Chillocothe, IL: American Botanist. ISBN 978-0-9293-3200-0.
- Whealy, Kent; Sue Stickland (1998). Heirloom Vegetables: A Home Gardener's Guide to Finding and Growing Vegetables from the Past. New York: Touchstone. ISBN 978-0-6848-3807-6.
- Whealy, Kent; Carolyn Male (1999). 100 Heirloom Tomatoes for the American Garden. Decorah, IA: Workman Publishing. ISBN 978-0-7611-1400-0.
- Whealy, Kent; Suzanne Ashworth (2002). Seed to Seed: Seed Saving and Growing Techniques for Vegetable Gardeners. Decorah, IA: Seed Savers Exchange. ISBN 978-1-8824-2458-0.
- Whealy, Kent; Joanne Thuente (2005). Garden Seed Inventory: An Inventory of Seed Catalogs Listing All Non-Hybrid Vegetable Seeds Available in the United States and Canada. Decorah, IA: Seed Savers Exchange. ISBN 978-1-8824-2460-3.
- Whealy, Kent (2009). Fruit, Berry and Nut Inventory, 4th edition: An Inventory of Nursery Catalogs and Websites Listing Fruit, Berry and Nut Varieties by Mail Order in the United States. Decorah, IA: Seeds Savers Exchange. ISBN 978-1-8824-2461-0.
