= Living Downstream =

Living Downstream is a 2010 feature-length true documentary based on the book by ecologist and cancer survivor Sandra Steingraber, Ph.D. The film was produced by The People's Picture Company.

== Summary ==
This film follows Sandra during one year as she travels across North America, working to break the silence about cancer and its environmental links.

After a routine cancer screening, Sandra receives results that thrust her into a period of medical uncertainty. The film starts the audience on two journeys with Sandra: her private struggles with cancer and her public fight to bring attention to the human rights issue of cancer prevention.

Living Downstream also follows the chemical carcinogens against which Sandra is fighting as they migrate throughout North America. The film documents interviews with scientists who believe these toxins may be working to cause cancer, and shows how chemicals enter the bodies of humans.

== Critical reception ==
On April 3, 2010, Living Downstream had its world premiere in Ithaca, New York, where Sandra Steingraber is a Scholar in Residence at Ithaca College, and lives with her family. The premiere was sold out.

In a review of the film on April 23, 2010, The Washington Post's Ann Hornaday noted that the film is "handsomly photographed and powerfully argued" and that "Steingraber's scientific cool and unflagging sense of mission make for an arresting portrait of a self-styled modern-day Rachel Carson."

On March 4, 2010, Ali Gadbow wrote that "director Chanda Chevannes’s Living Downstream is a convincing and necessary documentary. It’s also, despite its daunting subject matter, a movie you’ll want to watch....A few pitch-perfect moments provide all the emotional force you would expect from a “cancer movie,” minus the unpleasant tang of emotional manipulation. Living Downstream does an excellent job of engaging the viewer’s curiosity and telling an inconvenient truth through the lens of interesting science and one fascinating woman."

Stephanie Kirkwood Walker in the Journal of Religion and Film wrote that Living Downstream is "...a thoughtfully designed documentary that delights in its medium."

Shanna Shipman of the Pekin Daily Times wrote on April 19, 2010 that "the film reveals, in plain language and compelling visuals, several areas of scientific proof linking toxins in the environment to negative consequences for human health, substantiating the hunches and anecdotes among people who intuit the same conclusion."

On May 19, 2010, Toronto Star's Catherine Porter called the film "...powerful...haunting."

== Crew ==
- Chanda Chevannes - Producer/Director
- Nathan Shields - Producer/Editor
- Ben Gervais - Director of Photography
- J.R. Fountain - Sound Designer and Sound Re-recording Mixer
- Trent Richmond - Boom Operator and Sound Editor
- Pasquale Marco Veltri - Additional Photography
- Randall Wallace - Composer

== Funders ==
- The Ceres Trust
- Kendeda Sustainability Fund of the Tides Foundation
- The Canadian Independent Film and Video Fund
- Canada Council for the Arts
- Park Foundation
- Canadian Auto Workers Union – Social Justice Fund
- Doris Cadoux and Hal Schwartz
- Cancer Prevention Challenge: The Ya Ya Sistahs & Bruddahs Too! and Team Vitality
- Saunders-Matthey Cancer Prevention Coalition
