= Star Pointer =

American Standardbred racehorse

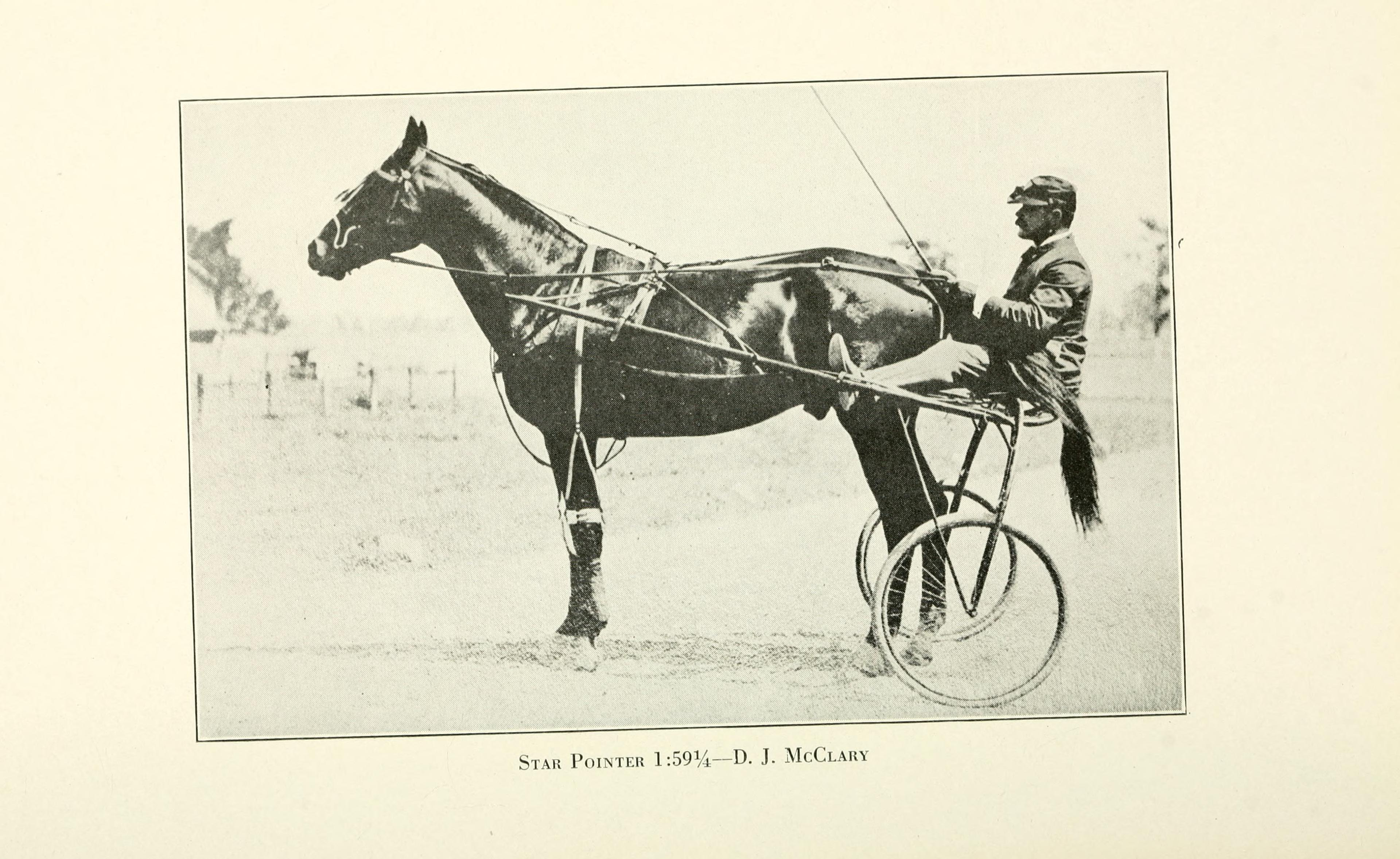
Star Pointer with David McClary

Star Pointer (1889–1910) was the first Standardbred race horse to complete a mile in less than two minutes. He was a pacer by Brown Hal out of Sweepstakes.

Star Pointer was bred by Captain Henry P. Pointer of Spring Hill, Tennessee. His sire was Brown Hal and his dam was Sweepstakes. He began racing in 1894.

On August 28, 1897, driven by David J. McClary, he broke the 2 minute mile barrier at around 4:00 pm with quarter times of 30 sec, 29 3/4, 29 1/4, 30 1/4 for a 1:59 1/4 time. His record stood until 1903, when it was beaten to 1:59 by Dan Patch.

David J. McClary Hall of Fame Inductee, 2002 The first person to drive a standardbred horse to win at a mile in less than two minutes was David J. McClary, a native of London, Ont. He achieved the feat on Aug. 28, 1897, when he drove pacer Star Pointer to an epic 1:59 1/4 at Readville, Mass. Star Pointer, owned by James Murphy of Chicago, had been a big, clumsy-gaited, knee-knocking pacer, particularly when going slow. But under McClary's careful tutelage Star Pointer in full flight traveled faster than any horse of his time. His record stood until 1903, when it was lowered to 1:59 by the legendary Dan Patch.

McClary was enjoying unsurpassed success among trainers of that era. Three days previous to the epochal mile by Star Pointer, he won a bitterly fought six-heat race with Guinette (2:02 1/4) at the Readville track. He retired from the sulky in 1915 and lived in Connecticut until his death in 1940. He was elected an Immortal to harness racing's Hall of Fame at Goshen, N.Y., in 1959.

On November 22, 1898, Star Pointer was sold in Madison Square Garden New York City for $15,000 to ex congressman White of Cleveland Ohio. James A Murphy wept upon the sale and loss of his beloved horse.

Star Pointer died of a stroke several weeks before the Christmas of 1910. His record was 22 victories and 4 seconds in 30 starts. He had a total of 60 wins in 79 heats and earnings of over $50,000 (equivalent to $1,690,000 in 2024). His remains were buried beneath the finish line of the Dean Racetrack in Palatine, Illinois but the exact location is now lost to history. He was inducted into the United States Harness Racing Hall of Fame in 1954.

Star Pointer was owned by James A. Murphy,(born in Rome New York August 11, 1846 and died January 24, 1920, in New York City)and was a resident of Chicago Illinois. He was famous throughout the United States as a thorough horseman and was a familiar figure on the tracks of the big meets. James A. Murphy organized the Central Grange and Stock Exchange. Utica Saturday Globe January 24, 1920 Obituary.
