= Seed systems =

Systems of crop planting and selection

Seed systems allow farmers to access crop seeds for planting. They include the actors, activities, and institutions involved in the maintenance of crop diversity, plant breeding and selection, seed production and dissemination. They cover all planting materials – both seeds and other planting materials, such as cuttings, tubers, bulbs, and tissue culture plantlets. Seed systems determine which crop varieties farmers grow. Seed systems influence societies’ food consumption patterns, diets, and play significant roles in supporting farming income generation. They are also important for crop evolution and conservation, food security, food sovereignty, and biocultural heritage.
