= Rare Breeds Canada =

Rare Breeds Canada (RBC) is a Canadian non-profit organization dedicated to preserving rare breeds of Canadian livestock. The organization was founded in 1987. It focuses on the rare breeds of livestock originating in Canada, including varieties of horses, sheep, pigs, chickens and cows. RBC publishes a Rare Breeds Priority List that separates livestock breeds into "critical", "endangered", "vulnerable", "at risk" and "recovering" categories. To assist with the preservation of these breeds, RBC coordinates a breeding program which uses host farms to manage small breeding groups which are used to build new flocks of animals. As the new groups are created, animals are selected for breeding and moved to new host farms, where the process is repeated. With the continuous selection of breeding stock and expansion of the host farm program, the goal is to prevent rare livestock breeds, especially those native to Canada, from going extinct. RBC works closely with The Livestock Conservancy, a similar organization in the United States, to preserve and promote breeds that have populations in the US and Canada. In June 2011, RBC moved their head offices to Notre-Dame-de-l’Île-Perrot, Quebec.

== See also ==
- Seeds of Diversity, a Canadian organization dedicated to preserving crop plants and pollinating insects
