= Australian Harness Horse of the Year =

Racing horse award

The Australian Harness Horse of the Year is an honour that recognises the top harness racing horse in Australia. The award is selected by industry people and media representatives.

The inaugural award was won in 1976 by Don't Retreat, a New South Wales pacer who won 14 of his 24 starts in the 1975-1976 season for a total of $122,415.

The first and only trotter to win the award was Maori's Idol in 1978, a season in which he won 22 of his 24 starts. The first three-year-old to win the award was a year later in 1979, when Run Joe Run won the award, since then a three-year-old has won the award three times. The youngest horse to win the award was Lombo Pocket Watch, who won as a two-year-old in 2006.

The horses that have won the most awards are:

- Westburn Grant, who won the award in 1989 as a three-year-old, and again in 1991 and 1992,
- Our Sir Vancelot, who won the 1997, 1998 and 1999 awards
- Blacks A Fake, the four time Interdominion winner, in 2007, 2008 and 2010
- Leap To Fame, winner in 2023, 2024 and 2025.

Smoken Up was the original winner of the 2011 award but became ineligible due to his disqualification from the Inter Dominion.

== Past winners ==
Horses that have been crowned Australian Harness Horse of the Year are:

Year	Horse	Comments
2025	Leap To Fame	
2024	Leap To Fame	Winner of the 2024 A G Hunter Cup, Miracle Mile Pace and Blacks A Fake Queensland Championship
2023	Leap To Fame	Winner of the 2023 Inter Dominion Pacing Championship, the Rising Sun and Sunshine Sprint
2022	King Of Swing (NZ)	Winner of the 2020 & 2022 A G Hunter Cup, 2020, 2021 & 2022 Miracle Mile Pace
2021	King Of Swing (NZ)	Winner of the 2020 A G Hunter Cup, 2020 and 2021 Miracle Mile Pace
2020	King Of Swing (NZ)	Winner of the 2020 A G Hunter Cup and Miracle Mile Pace
2019	Tiger Tara (NZ)	Winner of the 2019 A G Hunter Cup, 2018 Inter Dominion Pacing Championship, 2018 Victoria Cup
2018	Lazarus	Winner of the 2018 A G Hunter Cup, 2017 Inter Dominion Pacing Championship, 2017 Victoria Cup
2017	Smolda	Winner of the 2016 A G Hunter Cup, 2016 Inter Dominion Pacing Championship
2016	Lennytheshark	Winner of the 2015 Inter Dominion Pacing Championship, 2016 Victoria Cup
2015	Beautide	Winner of the 2014 & 2015 Inter Dominion Pacing Championship
2014	Beautide	Winner of the 2014 Inter Dominion Pacing Championship, 2013 Miracle Mile Pace
2013	Im Themightyquinn (NZ)	Winner of the 2011, 2012 & 2013 Inter Dominion Pacing Championship, 2011 and 2013 Auckland Cup
2012	Im Themightyquinn (NZ)	Winner of the 2011 & 2012 Inter Dominion Pacing Championship
2011	Im Themightyquinn (NZ)	Winner of the 2011 Inter Dominion Pacing Championship, 2011 Auckland Cup
2010	Blacks A Fake	Winner of the 2010 Inter Dominion Pacing Championship
2009	Mr Feelgood (USA)	Winner of the 2009 A G Hunter Cup, 2009 Inter Dominion Pacing Championship
2008	Blacks A Fake	Winner of the 2008 A G Hunter Cup, 2006, 2007 & 2008 Inter Dominion Pacing Championship, 2008 Queensland Pacing Championship
2007	Blacks A Fake	Winner of the 2006 & 2007 Inter Dominion Pacing Championship, 2006 Victoria Cup
2006	Lombo Pocket Watch	2 Year Old
2005	Sokyola (NZ)	Winner of 2003 & 2004 Miracle Mile Pace
2004	Sokyola (NZ)	Winner of the 2003 Miracle Mile Pace, 2004 Victoria Cup
2003	Double Identity	Winner of the 2002 Miracle Mile Pace, 2003 Victoria Cup, 2002 & 2003 Queensland Pacing Championship
2002	Smooth Satin	Winner of the 2002 Inter Dominion Pacing Championship, 2001 Miracle Mile Pace
2001	Atitagain (NZ)	Winner of the 2000 Australian Pacing Championship and 2001 Ben Hur, 2nd in the 2001 Inter Dominion Pacing Championship (behind Yulestar) and 2000 Miracle Mile Pace (Holmes D G), 3rd in the 2001 Victoria Cup
2000	Shakamaker	Winner of the 2000 Inter Dominion Pacing Championship and Ben Hur. 2nd in the 2000 Victoria Cup (behind Breeny's Fella) and Chariots of Fire (Lombo Rapida)
1999	Our Sir Vancelot (NZ)	Winner of the 1997, 1998 & 1999 Inter Dominion Pacing Championship
1998	Our Sir Vancelot (NZ)	Winner of the 1997 & 1998 Inter Dominion Pacing Championship, 1997 Miracle Mile Pace
1997	Our Sir Vancelot (NZ)	Winner of the 1997 Inter Dominion Pacing Championship
1996	Sunshine Band	Winner of the 1995 Queensland Pacing Championship
1995	Golden Reign	Winner of the 1995 Inter Dominion Pacing Championship, 1995 Victoria Cup
1994	Weona Warrior	Winner of the 1994 Inter Dominion Pacing Championship
1993	Jack Morris (NZ)	Winner of the 1993 Inter Dominion Pacing Championship
1992	Westburn Grant	Winner of the 1992 Inter Dominion Pacing Championship
1991	Westburn Grant	Winner of the 1989 & 1990 Miracle Mile Pace, 1990 Queensland Pacing Championship
1990	Thorate	Winner of the 1990 Inter Dominion Pacing Championship
1989	Westburn Grant	3 Year Old. Winner of the 1989 New Zealand Derby Globe Derby Mileand NSW Derby
1988	Village Kid	Winner of the 1986 & 1987 Miracle Mile Pace
1987	Rufus Young Blood	3 Year Old
1986	Village Kid	Winner of the 1986 A G Hunter Cup, 1986 Inter Dominion Pacing Championship, 1986 Miracle Mile Pace
1985	Preux Chevalier	Winner of the 1985 A G Hunter Cup, 1985 Inter Dominion Pacing Championship, 1985 Miracle Mile Pace, 1985 Queensland Pacing Championship, 1984 Victoria Cup
1984	Gammalite	Winner of the 1983 & 1984 Inter Dominion Pacing Championship
1983	Popular Alm	Winner of the 1983 A G Hunter Cup, 1983 Miracle Mile Pace, 1982 & 1983 Victoria Cup, 1983 Queensland Pacing Championship
1982	Gammalite	Winner of the 1982 A G Hunter Cup, 1982 Auckland Cup, 1981 Queensland Pacing Championship
1981	San Simeon	Winner of the 1981 Inter Dominion Pacing Championship
1980	Pure Steel	Winner of the 1978, 1979 & 1980 A G Hunter Cup
1979	Run Joe Run	As a 3 Year old recorded 17 wins and two seconds from 19 starts. His wins included the NSW Pacers Derby, NSW Sires Produce Stakes, NSW Southern Cross Stakes, Queensland Pacers Derby, Penrith Provincial Derby, Bankstown O’Shea Guineas and the inaugural Australian Pacers Derby in Perth.
1978	Maori's Idol	The first Australian trotter to beat 2 minutes for the mile, 40 wins from 46 races in his career, including 8 wins against pacers
1977	Paleface Adios	Winner of the 1976 Miracle Mile Pace, 1977 Victoria Cup, 1977 Queensland Pacing Championship
1976	Don't Retreat	Winner of the 1976 Victoria Cup, 1976 Queensland Pacing Championship

== See also ==
- Australian Pacing Championship
- New Zealand Trotting Cup
- Harness racing in Australia
- Harness racing in New Zealand
