= Australian Pacers Grand Circuit =

The Australian Grand Circuit for Pacers

== History ==
The Circuit began in 1977 and was designed to be the showpiece of the Australian Harness Racing Industry with horses competing from every state within Australia. In 1992 New Zealand was admitted and the Circuit was renamed the Australasian Grand Circuit.

The owners enter what they believe are their best horses available, and they are brought together to race for monetary awards. This can benefit owners, harness racing clubs, and the harness racing industry overall. 1977 was the event’s inaugural year. Stake money for the eight races forming the Circuit was $554,020.

The Grand Circuit has eliminated date clashes of major races which so often prevented the best horses from competing against each other to the detriment of clubs and the public.

Points were awarded during the Circuit, five points for a win, two points for second and one point for third. The horse with the greatest number of points is crowned Grand Circuit Winner. The Australian Harness Racing Council holds in perpetuity the Australasian Grand Circuit Trophy on which the name of each Grand Circuit Winner is engraved.

In the past there were a larger number of races (for example: 16 legs in 2005/2006) but in 2012 major changes were announced which reduced the number of races in the circuit, established minimum prizemoney levels and a new points system This was not popular with all industry participants.

In 2023 the Circuit reverted to being the Australian Grand Circuit again with the New Zealand races no longer involved.

== Current events ==
Grand Circuit races
Race	Date	Club/Track
Western Australia Pacing Cup	February	Gloucester Park
A.G. Hunter Cup	February	Melton Entertainment Park
Miracle Mile Pace	March	Menangle Park Paceway
The Blacks A Fake Queensland Championship	July	Albion Park, Queensland
Victoria Cup	October	Melton Entertainment Park
Inter Dominion Pacing Championship	December	selected hosting venues

== Previous Grand Circuit races ==
Grand Circuit races
Race	Date	Club/Track
Auckland Pacing Cup	March, May or December	Alexandra Park, Auckland
New Zealand Trotting Cup	November	Addington Raceway, Christchurch

== Grand Circuit Winners ==
- 2025 - Leap To Fame
- 2024 - Leap To Fame
- 2023 - Leap To Fame
- 2022 - King of Swing
- 2021 - King of Swing
- 2020 - King of Swing
- 2019 - Tiger Tara
- 2018 - Lazarus
- 2017 - Lazarus
- 2016 - Lennytheshark & Smolda
- 2015 - Christen Me
- 2014 - Christen Me
- 2013 - Im Themightyquinn
- 2012 - Smoken Up
- 2011 - Im Themightyquinn
- 2010 - Monkey King
- 2009 - Blacks A Fake & Mr Feelgood
- 2008 - Blacks A Fake
- 2007 - Flashing Red
- 2006 - Be Good Johnny
- 2005 - Elsu
- 2004 - The Falcon Strike
- 2003 - Double Identity & Young Rufus
- 2002 - Smooth Satin
- 2001 - Atitagain
- 2000 - Holmes D G
- 1999 - Christian Cullen
- 1998 - Our Sir Vancelot
- 1997 - Our Sir Vancelot
- 1996 - Sunshine Band
- 1995 - Golden Reign
- 1994 - Jack Morris
- 1993 - Franco Tiger
- 1992 - Westburn Grant
- 1991 - Westburn Grant
- 1990 - Westburn Grant
- 1989 - Our Maestro
- 1988 - Village Kid
- 1987 - Bag Limit
- 1986 - Village Kid
- 1985 - Preux Chevalier
- 1984 - Gammalite
- 1983 - Gammalite
- 1982 - Gammalite
- 1981 - San Simeon
- 1980 - Pure Steel
- 1979 - Koala King
- 1978 - Pure Steel
- 1977 - Paleface Adios

== See also ==
- Harness racing in Australia
- Harness racing in New Zealand
