= Im Themightyquinn =

Australian Standardbred racehorse

- Breed: Standardbred
- Sire: Washington V C
- Grandsire: Presidential Ball
- Dam: Love Sign
- Damsire: Sokys Atom
- Sex: Gelding
- Foaled: 8 November 2004
- Country: New Zealand; Australia
- Color: Bay
- Breeder: W D Kennedy
- Trainer: Gary Hall Junior
- Record: 111:58-21-13
- Earnings: $4,567,456

Major wins
- Western Australian Pacing Cup (2011, 2012 & 2013); Fremantle Cup (2009, 2011 & 2012); Inter Dominion Pacing Championship (2011, 2012 & 2013); Auckland Trotting Cup (2011 & 2013); The Blacks A Fake (2014); Cranbourne Cup (2010)

Awards
- Aged Pacer of the Year & Australian Harness Horse of the Year (2011, 2012 & 2013)

Honors
- Australasian Pacers Grand Circuit Champion (2011 & 2013)
- Last updated on 2016-03-20

Im Themightyquinn (foaled 8 November 2004) is an Australian champion Standardbred race horse notable for being a three time Australian Harness Horse of the Year and three time winner of the Inter Dominion. He was inducted into the Inter Dominion Hall of Fame.

Im Themightyquinn was entered into the 2006 Premier Sale in New Zealand where he was bred but was withdrawn from the sale likely due to lack of commercial appeal as he was a small yearling out of a not particularly successful mare. He was bought privately by Peter Bagrie for $13,000.

Racing in New Zealand at ages two and three he had limited success including a win in the Northern Stakes and a third in the Harness Jewels. He faced tough competition including Auckland Reactor. He was then sold to clients of Western Australian trainer Gary Hall Sr for $180,000.

At age four Im Themightyquinn was third in the Golden Nugget, won the McInerney Ford Classic, finished third in the Fremantle Cup and in Sydney was second in the Chariots Of Fire. He won 8 of his 16 starts for the 2008–09 season. In 2009–10 Im Themightyquinn won the Fremantle Cup and finished second in the Australian Pacing Championship behind Has The Answers and in the Western Australian Pacing Cup to Washakie. In Victoria he was third in the A G Hunter Cup behind Bondy. In the Hunter Cup he sprinted quickly from near the rear of the field passing horses such as Smoken Up, Mr Feelgood and Washakie. He won 6 of 12 starts for the season and $374,935. He was also named Western Australian Harness Horse of the Year.

In 2010–11 he won the Fremantle Cup with a brilliant burst of speed and the Western Australian Pacing Cup despite being disadvantaged by the slow pace of the race after he settled near the rear of the field. In Victoria he won the Cranbourne Cup and was third in both the Victoria Cup and A G Hunter Cup. Taken to New Zealand Im Themightyquinn won the Auckland Trotting Cup defeating Mr Feelgood. The 2011 Inter Dominion had been scheduled to be run at Addington, Christchurch but after the 2011 Christchurch earthquake the series was moved to Alexandra Park, Auckland. Im Themightyquinn won both of his heats in an Australian dominated series. In the final Smoken Up crossed the line first ahead of Im Themightyquinn with Blacks A Fake third. However, when Smoken Up was disqualified after returning a positive swab Im Themightyquinn was promoted to being the 2011 Inter Dominion champion. In Australia he won $334,735 for the season and was the Australian Harness Horse of the Year and Australasian Pacers Grand Circuit Champion.

Early in the 2011–12 season Im Themightyquinn travelled to New South Wales and Victoria but was defeated in the Miracle Mile and Victoria Cup after becoming dehydrated. However back in his home state he recorded eleven consecutive wins. Included in the sequence was another Western Australian Pacing Cup in a track record mile rate of 1:56 for 2506 metres and a win in the Fremantle Cup where he destroyed his rivals winning by 14 metres in a mile rate of 1:56.5 over 2906 metres. In 2012 the Inter Dominion was contested at Gloucester Park, Perth where Im Themightyquinn swept his three heats before a last to first win in the final. He recovered from a fever on the morning of the day before the final. For the season he started 13 times for 9 wins and $1.25m in stakes. For the second consecutive year he was awarded the Australian Harness Horse of the Year title.

Im Themightyquinn’s start to the 2012–13 season was delayed by an attack of atrial fibrillation however he won first up in the Mount Eden Sprint before recording a record fifteenth consecutive Gloucester Park win. In Victoria he finished third in the Victoria Cup at Melton. Back in Perth Im Themightyquinn won a third Western Australian Pacing Cup, one less than the record of four Cup wins by Pure Steel and Village Kid. The win came a week after he had beaten at Gloucester Park after 18 consecutive wins there. After a heat win at Gloucester Park Im Themightyquinn travelled to Menangle Park Paceway for the Inter Dominion Final. He won the Inter Dominion for a third time with a last to first finish beating Mah Sish and Excel Stride after being 10 lengths from the leaders with 800 metres to run. It was his ninth consecutive win in Inter Dominion competition. Shortly after the Inter Dominion Im Themightyquinn travelled to New Zealand and won the Auckland Trotting Cup for a second time defeating triple New Zealand Trotting Cup winner Terror To Love by 2 ¾ lengths. He was the Australasian Pacers Grand Circuit Champion and Australian Harness Horse of the Year for the 2012–13 season where he won 12 of 17 starts and $1,077,610.

Injury and illness then restricted Im Themightyquinn’s career however he did still travel to Brisbane in 2014 and win the Sunshine Sprint and The Blacks A Fake at Albion Park. In the Sunshine Sprint he ran a track record 1:50.4 mile rate. In 2015 he was retired after sustaining an injury in training while being prepared for an attempt to win a fourth Inter Dominion. He won 58 of 111 starts with 21 seconds and 13 third places.

In 2024, 10 years after winning the event, Im Themightyquinn led out the field for the running of the Pinjarra Cup at Pinjarra Paceway.
