= Queensland Pacing Championship =

The Queensland Pacing Championship was the most important event in Queensland harness racing. Up to 2015 it was usually the opening leg of the Australasian Pacers Grand Circuit. The race was previously known as the Albion Park Ten Thousand between 1969 and 1974 and then as the Sir Clive Uhr Championship from 1975 to 1980. In 2006 the race was postponed from Saturday to Tuesday due to rain and it was not run in 2007 due to the Equine Influenza outbreak that occurred in Queensland and New South Wales. In April 2016 Racing Queensland announced that the Queensland Pacing Championship would be discontinued due to financial considerations.

== Winners list ==
Year	Horse	Driver	Mile Rate	Distance
2015	Our Hi Jinx	Greg Sugars	1:55.0	2680m
2014	For A Reason	Luke McCarthy	1:56.4	2680m
2013*	Ideal Scott	John McCarthy	1:57.8	2680m
2012	Washakie	Luke McCarthy	1:57.5	2680m
2011	Mr Feelgood	Luke McCarthy	1:57.0	2680m
2010	Mr Feelgood	Luke McCarthy	1:55.9	2680m
2009	Blacks A Fake	Natalie Rasmussen	1:58.9	2609m
2008	Blacks A Fake	Natalie Rasmussen	1.56.0	2138m
2007	Not held			
2006	Slipnslide	Luke McCarthy	1:59.2	2138m
2005	Slipnslide	Luke McCarthy	1:55.7	2138m
2004	Cobbity Classic	Luke McCarthy	1:57.3	2680m
2003	Double Identity	Harry Martin	1:55.7	2138m
2002	Double Identity	Harry Martin	1:58.0	2647m
2001	Courage Under Fire	Brian Hancock	2:00.0	2100m
2000	Tailamade Lombo	Chris Alford	1:55.3	2100m
1999	Kyema Kid	Richard Hancock	1:57.8	2100m
1998	Three Half Whites	Justin Warwick	1:58.0	2100m
1997	Peter Santos	Neil Coy	1:58.4	2100m
1996	Desperate Comment	Peter Jones	1:55.7	2100m
1995	Sunshine Band	Chris Gleeson	1:55.8	2100m
1994	Chandon	Vic Frost	1:58.1	2100m
1993	Warrior Khan	Andrew Peace	1:57.0	2100m
1992	Franco Tiger	Brian Gath	1:58.0	2100m
1991	Franco Ice	Graham Lang	1:55.0	2100m
1990	Westburn Grant	Vic Frost	1:57.4	1609m
1999	Thorate	Brian Hancock	1:53.9	1609m
1988	Our Maestro	Vin Knight	1:56.4	1609m
1987	Henry Luca	Kevin Thomas	1:58.1	1609m
1986	Wondai's Mate	Darryl Reinke	1:55.6	1609m
1985	Preux Chevalier	Barry Perkins	1:54.3	1609m
1984	Wondai's Mate	Darryl Reinke	1:56.2	1609m
1983	Popular Alm	Vin Knight	1:55.8	1609m
1982	Double Agent	Joe Ilsley	1:16.6	2530m
1981	Gammalite	Bruce Clarke	1:17.5	2530m
1980	Koala King	Brian Hancock	1:17.1	2530m
1979	Koala King	Kevin Robinson	1:18.5	2530m
1978	Rip Van Winkle	Michael Vanderkemp	1:17.2	2530m
1977	Paleface Adios	Colin Pike	1:18.4	2530m
1976	Don't Retreat	Laurie Moulds	1:19.4	2530m
1975	Paleface Adios	Colin Pike	1:18.9	2530m
1974	Spike	Kevin Robinson	1:19.7	2530m
1973	Apollo Eleven	Kevin Newman	2:11.4	12f 132y
1972	Red Vicar	Laurie Moulds	2:05.4	12f 132y
1971	Para Chief	Rex Hocking	2:06.2	12f 132y
1970	Style Beaux	Tom Mahar	2:09.0	12f 132y
1969	Billy Adios	Kevin Newman	2:06.8	12f 132y

The 2007 race was not held due to Equine Influenza.

== See also ==
- A G Hunter Cup
- Australian Pacing Championship
- Inter Dominion Pacing Championship
- Miracle Mile Pace
- New Zealand Trotting Cup
- Victoria Cup
- Harness racing in Australia
- Harness racing in New Zealand
