= Village Kid (horse) =

Australian Standardbred racehorse

- Breed: Standardbred
- Sire: Gramatan
- Grandsire: Fallacy
- Dam: Totara Valley
- Damsire: Regal Yankee
- Sex: Gelding
- Foaled: 4 December 1980
- Died: 24 April 2012
- Country: Australia
- Color: Bay
- Breeder: I M Behrns
- Owner: Gordon Cox; Cecelia Cox; Bill Horn
- Trainer: Bill Horn
- Record: 160:93-25-12
- Earnings: $2,117,870

Major wins
- Inter Dominion (1986); Miracle Mile Pace (1986,1987); Western Australian Pacing Cup (1985, 1986, 1988, 1989); A G Hunter Cup (1986); Harold Park Cup (1986); Australian Pacing Championship (1987); Treuer Memorial (1987); Fremantle Cup (1988, 1989)

Awards
- Australian Harness Horse of the Year & Aged Pacer of the Year (1986); Australian Harness Horse of the Year & Aged Pacer of the Year) (1988); Aged Pacer of the Year (1989); Australian Pacers Grand Circuit Champion (1986 & 1988)

Honors
- Western Australian Racing Industry Hall of Fame; Village Kid Sprint at Gloucester Park and Northam
- Last updated on 2016-01-26

Village Kid (4 December 1980 – 24 April 2012) was an Australian champion standardbred race horse bred in New Zealand. He was twice awarded the title of Australian Harness Horse of the Year and was known as "Willie".

== Early life ==
Village Kid was purchased by Gordon Cox of Western Australia for approximately $36,000 after having won 3 of 9 races in New Zealand. He began racing as a three-year-old in New Zealand but aged four he won 17 of 27 races including the Western Australian Pacing Cup where he beat the favourite Preux Chevalier. Racing in the 1985 Inter Dominion at Moonee Valley he finished 2nd on the first night, won in slow time on night two and then was beaten by Preux Chevalier on the third night of heats. In the Inter Dominion final he led early before handing the lead to Preux Chevalier after a lap and finished second after not gaining a clear run until near the finish.

== 1985-86 season ==
In 1985-86 Village Kid won the Western Australian Pacing Cup for a second time. In the Miracle Mile Pace he beat Atashy Luck untouched by 13 metres in 1.56.9 and then won the Harold Park Cup. He then trounced Bag Limit to win the A G Hunter Cup leading throughout. At the 1986 Inter Dominion at Albion Park in Brisbane he swept his three heats including a 21-metre win over a mile in 1.55.5. In the final he ran a track record mile rate of 1.55.6 for 2100 metres breaking the previous record held by Popular Alm and winning by 13 metres from Vanderport. He won 17 of 22 races with 2 seconds and 1 third and was named Australian Harness Horse of the Year and was the Australian Pacers Grand Circuit Champion. His stakes earnings during the season of $541,930 were a record for a single season in Australian harness racing.

== 1986-87 season ==
In 1986-87 Village Kid was third in the Miracle Mile Pace to Master Mood and My Lightning Blue in a race record 1.56.1 mile and was then third in the Western Australian Pacing Cup behind Our Ian Mac and third in the Fremantle Cup. He was second in the Winfield Cup behind Bag Limit. He started 19 times in 1986-87 for 13 wins 1 second and 4 thirds.

== 1987-88 season ==
In 1987-88 Village Kid won his first 13 starts including the Australian Pacing Championship which was held at Gloucester Park, the Miracle Mile Pace where he won in 1.57.7 becoming the first horse to win the race twice and the Treuer Memorial at Bankstown. He also won the Western Australian Pacing Cup for a third time which was a 36th win at Gloucester Park breaking the record of Pure Steel and also enabled him to break the Australian Harness Racing stakes record previously held by Gammalite. After a win in the Fremantle Cup he was unplaced behind Bag Limit in the 1988 Winfield Cup. The defeat broke a 19 race winning sequence that had begun the previous season. The winning sequence is one of the greatest in harness racing history as while not the longest, all of the wins came against fast class rivals including in group one races. In the 1988 Inter Dominion at Harold Park he was first, second and second in the heats but in the final he was eighth after always being well back in running. He won 14 of 18 starts for the season.

== 1988-89 season ==
In 1988-89 Village Kid had his Miracle Mile Pace invitation withdrawn when suitable travel arrangements could not be made but did travel to Melbourne for the Australian Pacing Championship where he finished fourth. Back in Perth he won the Western Australian Pacing Cup for a fourth time equalling the record of Pure Steel and the Fremantle Cup. Gloucester Park was hosting the 1989 Inter Dominion and Village Kid won all three heats including a 1.55.2 track record mile rate over 1700 metres and a 1.56.5 rate over 2100 metres which was also a track record. A win the final would have seen him pass $2m in stakes earnings however in the final he worked hard in running and was a close fourth to Jodie’s Babe. His effort to win all three Inter Dominion heats a second time had not been achieved previously.

== 1990 to 1993 ==
Village Kid tried unsuccessfully to win a fifth Western Australian Pacing Cup when, along with the favoured Westburn Grant, he was unplaced. He was sore after finishing fifth in the Fremantle Cup. In the winter of 1990 he won at Gloucester Park becoming the first horse in Australian harness racing to earn $2 million. Aged 13 he set a world record for his age with a 1.55.1 time trial at Gloucester Park.

== After racing ==
He retired from racing after a special ceremony at Gloucester Park on 15 October 1993, with a career record on 160 starts for 93 wins, 24 seconds and 12 thirds for stakes of $2,117,870. He retired as the richest standard-bred in Australasia and the richest pacing gelding in the world and only 11 pacers in the world had earned more stake money than Village Kid at the time of his retirement. Northam Harness Racing Club named their feature sprint after him. After he died in April 2012 the Celebrity Sprint, an important race at Gloucester Park was renamed the Village Kid Sprint.
