= Inter Dominion Pacing Championship =

Harness racing competition in Australia and New Zealand

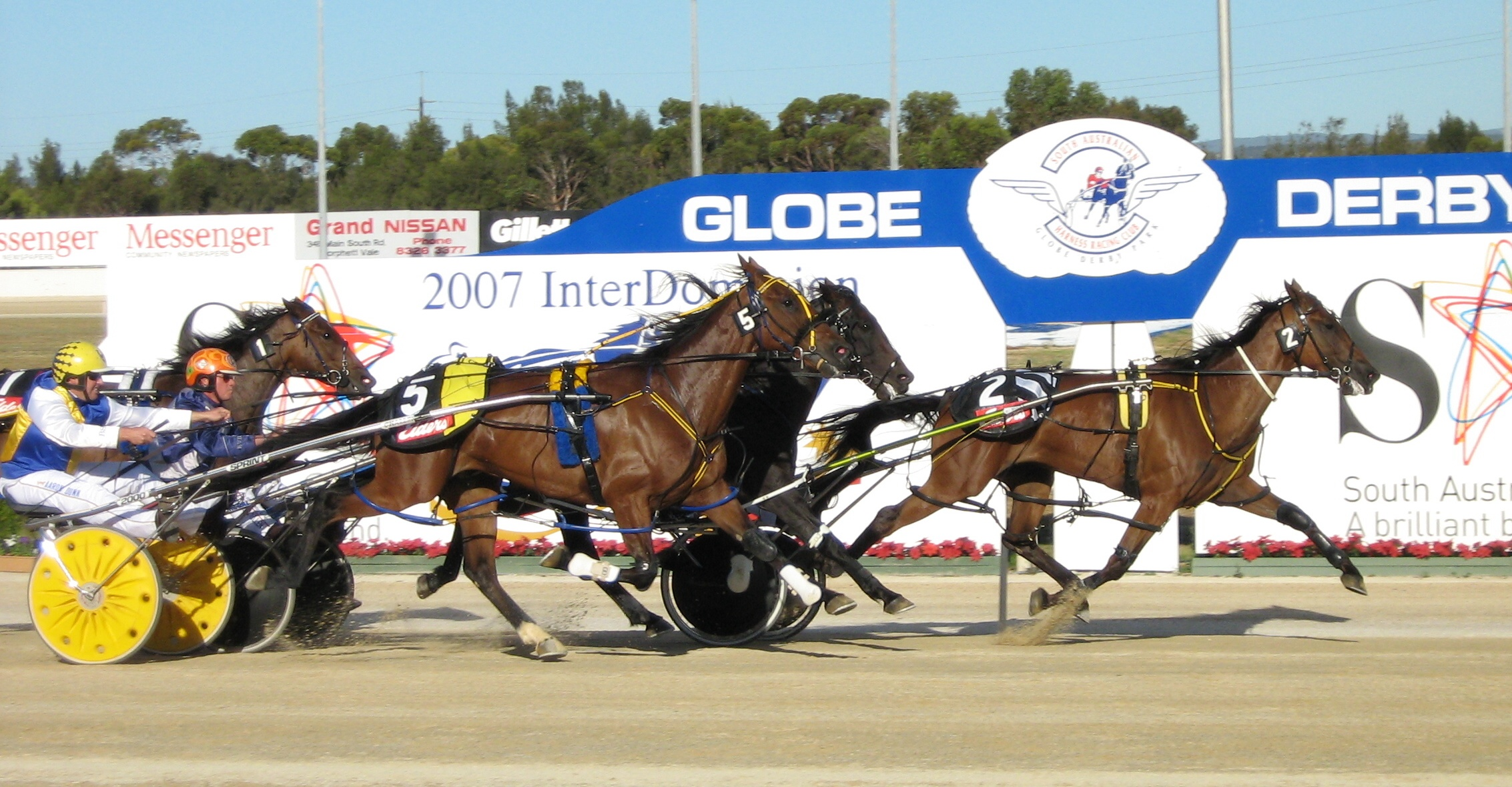
Action from the Pacers Consolation Final - 2007 Interdominion @ Globe Derby Park

for winners of the trotting event see: Inter Dominion Trotting Championship

The Inter Dominion is a harness racing competition that has been contested since 1936 in Australia and New Zealand.

The Inter Dominion was the brain child of Western Australian Trotting Association Chairman Mr. J P Stratton, with the first series held at Gloucester Park, Perth.

The host of the series is selected between the six harness racing states of Australia and the North and South Islands of New Zealand. It was traditionally held in New Zealand once in each four years.

The traditional format is a series of heats held over a two-week period, with the final held in a third. Competitors earn points based on their finishing order in each heat, the 14 horses that accrue the most points over the series go into the Grand Final.

The winner is determined by the finishing order in the Grand Final. There is also a Consolation race.

The scheduling of the distances is usually at the discretion of the host club. The usual distance is a longer distance in excess of 2400 metres.

Blacks A Fake made history in 2010, by becoming the only horse to win four Inter Dominion races.

== Pacing championship results ==
Winners and place-getters in the Inter Dominion pacing championship are:

Year	Venue	Winner	Driver	Trainer(s)	2nd place	3rd place
1936	Perth	Logan Derby	Jim Agnew	Harry Barnes	Evicus	Nancywood
1937	Adelaide	Dan's Son	Ben Coram	Ben Coram	Wrinkle	Joy's John
1938	Addington, Christchurch	Pot Luck	Maurice Holmes	Maurice Holmes	Parisenne	Blair Athol
1939	Launceston	Springfield Globe	Peter O’Shea	Peter O'Shea	Globe Dorell	Radiant Walla
1940	Perth	Grand Mogul	Keith Anderson	Keith Anderson	Master Dixie	Moreica
1947	Perth	Bandbox	Len Moriarty	Len Moriarty	Dixie Stretta	Para Derby
1948	Alexandra Park, Auckland	Emulous	Wally K Tatterson	Wally K Tatterson	Loyal Nurse	Knave Of Diamonds
1949	Adelaide	Single Direct	Edgar Kennerley	Edgar Kennerley	Hatteras	Amourous
1950	Melbourne	Captain Sandy	Jack Watts	Jock Bain	Globe Direct	Sprayman
1951	Christchurch	Vedette	Maurice Holmes	Maurice Holmes	Soangetaha	Parawa Derby
1952	Sydney	Avian Derby	G D Wilson	Syl Bray	Recovered	Floodlight
1953	Perth	Captain Sandy	R (Bob) Pollock	Dinny Nolan	Ribands	Kellett
1954	Wayville	Tennessee Sky	Frank Kersley	Frank Kersley	Recovered	Andi
1955	Auckland	Tactician	Maurice McTigue	Maurice McTigue	Johnny Globe	Petite Yvonne
1956	Harold Park, Sydney	Gentleman John	Eric Rothacker	Eric Rothacker	Mineral Spring	Caduceus
1957	Gloucester Park	Radiant Venture	F (Digger) Connor	Max Stephens	Robert Sheen	Precipitation
1958	Wayville, South Australia	Free Hall	Bill Shinn	Bill Shinn	Sibelia	First Division
1959	Melbourne	Young Pedro	Leo Hunt	Leo Hunt	Dusty Miller	Billabong Scott
1960	Harold Park	Caduceus	Jack Litten	Jack Litten	Apmat	Maestro's Melody
1961	Christchurch	Massacre	Doug Watts	Duncan Campbell	False Step	Arania
1962	Gloucester Park	James Scott	Perc Hall	Percy Hall	Lew's Hope	Super Paddy
1963	Wayville	Cardigan Bay (NZ)	Peter Wolfenden	Peter Wolfenden	Dusty Miller	Waitaki Hanover
1964	Melbourne	Minuteman	Eric Hurley	Eric Hurley	Angelique	Tactile
1965	Forbury Park Raceway, Dunedin	Jay Ar / Robin Dundee (dead heat)	George Noble / Doody Townley	George Noble / Jack Walsh	-	Disband
1966	Harold Park	Chamfer's Star	Brian Forester	Max Treuer	Robin Dundee	Dale's Gift
1967	Gloucester Park	Binshaw	Phil Coulson	Phil Coulson	Coneeda	Goulburn View
1968	Auckland	First Lee	Kevin Robinson	Kevin Robinson	Holy Hal	Blue Pennant
1969	Adelaide	Richmond Lass	Kevin Brook	Jack Moore	Adios Court	Twinkle Hanover
1970	Melbourne	Bold David	Alf Simons	Alf Simons	Bylaw	Bon Adios
1971 *	Addington	Stella Frost (NZ)	Doody Townley	Doody Townley	Manaroa	Last Flood
1972	Brisbane	Welcome Advice	Alan Harpley	George Harpley, Junee, NSW	Monaro	Reichman
1973	Sydney	Hondo Grattan	A. D. (Tony) Turnbull	Tony Turnbull	Royal Ascot	Glamour Chief
1974	Perth	Hondo Grattan	A. D. (Tony) Turnbull	Tony Turnbull	Adios Victor	Royal Gaze
1975	Alexandra Park	Young Quinn (NZ)	John Langdon	Charlie Hunter	Hi Foyle	Speedy Guest
1976	Adelaide	Carclew	Chris Lewis	Len Lewis	Pure Steel	Don't Retreat
1977	Brisbane	Stanley Rio	John Noble	George Noble	Master Findlay	Sporting Son
1978	Melbourne	Markovina	Brian Gath	Brian Gath	Hermosa Star	Velvet Prince
1979	Addington	Rondel	Peter Wolfenden	Peter Young	Sapling	Miss Pert
1980	Sydney	Koala King	Brian Hancock	Ray Wisbey	Locarno	Pure Steel
1981	Hobart	San Simeon	Lou Austin	Lou Austin	Single Again	Ardstraw
1982	Perth	Rhett's Law	Colin Warwick	Mark Roberts	Lehigh Lad	Popular Alm
1983	Auckland	Gammalite	Bruce Clarke	Leo O'Connor	Popular Alm	Delightful Lady
1984	Adelaide	Gammalite	Bruce Clarke	Leo O'Connor	Thor Lobell	Bundanoon
1985	Melbourne	Preux Chevalier	Barry Perkins	Barry Perkins	Village Kid	Game Oro
1986	Brisbane	Village Kid	Chris Lewis	Bill Horn	Vanderport	Line On
1987	Christchurch	My Lightning Blue	Jim O’Sullivan	Jim O'Sullivan	Paleface Bubble	Sunset Candios
1988	Sydney	Our Maestro	John Binskin	Bob Knight	Palimar	Tiffs Mystery
1989	Perth	Jodie's Babe	Scott Stewart	Bob Knight	Our Maestro	Kylie's Hero
1990	Adelaide	Thorate	Howard James	Brian Hancock	Gaelic Skipper	Weona Chief
1991	Auckland	Mark Hanover (NZ)	Mark Purdon	Roy & Barry Purdon	Christopher Vance (NZ)	Franco Ice
1992	Melbourne	Westburn Grant	Vic Frost	Vic Frost	Franco Tiger	Blossom Lady (NZ)
1993	Brisbane	Jack Morris (NZ)	Rod Chambers	Shaun Harney	Warrior Khan	Blossom Lady (NZ)
1994	Sydney	Weona Warrior	Brian Hancock	Brian Hancock	Ultra Jey (USA)	Valley Champ
1995	Christchurch	Golden Reign	Chris Alford	Noel Alexander	Chokin (NZ)	Desperate Comment
1996	Perth	Young Mister Charles (NZ)	Peter Morris	Garry Hancock	Sunshine Band	Master Musician
1997	Adelaide	Our Sir Vancelot (NZ)	Brian Hancock	Brian Hancock	Rainbow Knight	Iraklis (NZ)
1998	Hobart	Our Sir Vancelot (NZ)	Brian Hancock	Brian Hancock	Try A Fluke (NZ)	Late Bid (NZ)
1999	Auckland	Our Sir Vancelot (NZ)	Brian Hancock	Brian Hancock	Iraklis (NZ)	Bogan Fella (NZ)
2000	Moonee Valley	Shakamaker	John Justice	John Justice	Breeneys Fella (NZ)	Happy Asset (NZ)
2001	Albion Park	Yulestar (NZ)	Tony Shaw	Lorraine Nolan	Atitagain (NZ)	Pocket Me (NZ)
2002	Harold Park	Smooth Satin	Steve Turnbull	Steve Turnbull	Shakamaker	Trois Frere
2003	Addington	Baltic Eagle (NZ)	Kim Prentice	Kim Prentice	Mont Denver Gold	Holmes DG (NZ)
2004	Gloucester Park	Jofess	Darren Hancock	Darren Hancock	The Falcon Strike (NZ)	Sokyola (NZ)
2005	Auckland	Elsu (NZ)	David Butcher	Geoff Small	Sly Flyin (NZ)	Just An Excuse (NZ)
2006	Hobart	Blacks A Fake	Natalie Rasmussen	Natalie Rasmussen	Karloo Mick	Slipnslide
2007	Globe Derby	Blacks A Fake	Natalie Rasmussen	Natalie Rasmussen	Winforu (NZ)	Foreal (NZ)
2008	Moonee Valley	Blacks A Fake	Natalie Rasmussen	Natalie Rasmussen	Divisive	Smoken Up (NZ)
2009	Gold Coast	Mr Feelgood (USA)	Anthony Butt	Tim Butt	Blacks A Fake	Karloo Mick
2010	Menangle	Blacks A Fake	Natalie Rasmussen	Natalie Rasmussen	Monkey King	Smoken Up (NZ)
2011	Alexandra Park	Im Themightyquinn*	Gary Hall (Junior)	Gary Hall (Senior)	Blacks A Fake	Smiling Shard
2012	Gloucester Park	Im Themightyquinn	Gary Hall (Junior)	Gary Hall (Senior)	Mysta Magical Mach	Lombo Navigator
2013	Menangle	Im Themightyquinn	Gary Hall (Junior)	Gary Hall (Senior)	Mah Sish	Excel Stride
2014	Menangle	Beautide	James Rattray	James Rattray	Seel N Print	For A Reason
2015	Menangle	Beautide	James Rattray	James Rattray	Flaming Flutter	For A Reason
2015 (Dec)	Gloucester Park	Lennytheshark	Chris Alford	David Aiken	Lovers Delight	Flaming Flutter
2016	Gloucester Park	Smolda	Mark Purdon	Mark Purdon	Hectorjayjay	Beaudiene Boaz
2017	Gloucester Park	Lazarus (NZ)	Mark Purdon	Mark Purdon	Chicago Bull	Tiger Tara
2018	Tabcorp Park Melton	Tiger Tara (NZ)	Todd McCarthy	Kevin Pizzuto	Our Uncle Sam	Cruz Bromac
2019	Auckland	Ultimate Sniper	Natalie Rasmussen	Mark Purdon & Natalie Rasmussen	Mach Shard	Thefixer
2021	Menangle	Boncel Benjamin*	Josh Gallagher	Jason Grimson	Expensive Ego	Alta Orlando
2022	Melton	I Cast No Shadow	Cameron Hart	Jason Grimson	Torrid Saint	Act Now
2023	Albion Park	Leap To Fame	Grant Dixon	Grant Dixon	Better Eclipse	Swayzee
2024	Menangle	Don Hugo	Luke McCarthy	Luke McCarthy	Minstrel	Max Delight
2025	Albion Park	Leap To Fame	Grant Dixon	Grant Dixon	Speak The Truth	Cya Art
2026	Albion Park	Captains Mistress	Cameron Hart	Jason Grimson	Leap To Fame	Nyack

Notes:

- In 1971 Juniors Image was first past the post but was disqualified for a positive swab test.
- In 2011 Smoken Up was first past the post but was disqualified for a positive drugs test. A court challenge to the disqualification was not successful.
- In 2021 Expensive Ego was first past the post, however was relegated to second placing after causing interference to runner-up Boncel Benjamin.

== 2025 Inter Dominion (ID25 Brisbane) ==
Albion Park was chosen to hold the 2025 Inter Dominion. There were 2 rounds of heats scheduled (down from 3 rounds in prior years):

- Round 1 on Saturday 5 July 2025 with 3 heats for pacers and 2 heats for trotters. All pacing heats over 2138m from a mobile start.
- Round 2 on Saturday 12 July 2025. All pacing heats over 2680m.

The Grand Finals and consolation races were scheduled for Saturday 19 July 2025. The Grand final raced over 3157m and the consolation 2680m. All races from a mobile start.

Horse	Trainer(s)	Final Qual. order	Notes	Heat 1	Heat 2	Heat 3	Heat 4	Heat 5	Heat 6	Race & bonus points	Barrier draw for Final	Grand Final placing
Always Smokin NZ	Chantal Turpin	26		8th	x	x	8th	x	x	10	x	x
Aroda NZ	Grant Dixon	27	3rd 2024 Rising Sun	x	3rd	x	x	5th	x	19	12 (2.5)	12th
Beach Ball NZ	Luke McCarthy	23		7th	x	x	x	x	6th	13	x	x
Better Eclipse	Jess Tubbs	6	2024 5th NZ Cup, 3rd Kilmore Cup, 1st Auckland Cup, 2nd ID23 & 7th ID22	4th	x	x	x	4th	x	18	x	x
Blacksadance	Chantal Turpin	14		x	SCR	x	x	x	x	x	x	x
Captain Hammerhead	Grant Dixon	12		12th	x	x	x	x	8th	6	x	x
Captains Knock	Brad Hewitt	7	4th Rising Sun	x	2nd	x	x	x	2nd	26	8 (2.1)	7th
Catch A Wave	Andy Gath	3		2nd	x	x	x	7th	x	22	7	10th
Classie Washington NZ	Darren Garrard	28		x	x	8th	x	x	10th	8	x	x
Cya Art NZ	Kerryann Morris	33		x	4th	x	x	x	3rd	21	4	3rd
Don Hugo	Luke McCarthy	1	1st ID24, 2nd 2024 Rising Sun	x	1st	x	x	8th	x	24	6	4th
Don Lu	Luke McCarthy	24		x	9th	x	x	10th	x	7	x	x
Dougs Platter	Kevin Pizzuto	39		x	11th	x	x	x	7th	8	x	x
Frankie Ferocious	Ben Crosby	29	4th 2024 Miracle Mile, 1st 2024 Chariots of Fire	10th	x	x	7th	x	x	9	x	x
Free Thinker	Grant Dixon	36		11th	x	x	x	x	11th	4	x	x
Hector NZ	Andy Gath	11		x	x	11th	x	x	5th	10	x	x
Hot And Treacherous NZ	John Livingstone	30		x	10th	x	x	SCR	x	3	x	x
I Break The Line	Luke McCarthy	34		x	x	5th	5th	x	x	16	x	x
Jimartee	Cristina Monte	10		x	6th	x	x	6th	x	14	x	x
Jorge Street	B A Heenan	4		x	12th	x	x	x	9th	4	x	x
Kanena Provlima	Kerryann Morris	18		x	x	7th	x	3rd	x	17	x	x
Leap To Fame	Grant Dixon	2	1st ID23, 2024 Hunter Cup & Miracle Mile Pace	x	x	1st	x	1st	x	40	1	1st
Luv Bite	Graham Dwyer	41		6th	x	x	11th	x	x	9	x	x
Manila Playboy	Shane Fraser	20		x	x	x	x	x	x	x	x	x
Max Delight	David Aiken	5	3rd ID24, 4th ID21, 1st 2021 Victoria Cup, 3rd 2020 Chariots of Fire	x	x	4th	2nd	x	x	22	10 (2.3)	5th
Mossdale Terry NZ	Shane Graham	40		x	x	SCR	x	x	x	x	x	x
Nyack	James Rattray	17		x	8th	x	x	2nd	x	18	x	x
O B Legal NZ	Peter Greig	45		x	7th	x	9th	x	x	10	x	x
Our Luciana	James Rattray	35		x	x	x	x	x	x	x	x	x
Petes Said So	Kerryann Morris	25	6th ID22, 8th ID23, 6th ID24	x	x	3rd	4th	x	x	23	5	6th
Pinny Tiger	Michael Brennan	13		x	x	x	x	x	x	x	x	x
Pinseeker NZ	Jonny Cox	15		x	x	2nd	x	11th	x	13	x	x
Rakero Rebel NZ	Jess Tubbs	16		3rd	x	x	x	x	4th	23	2	11th
Ravishing Sloy	Kevin Pizzuto	46		x	x	x	x	x	x	x	x	x
Speak The Truth	Shannon Price	9	6th ID23, 3rd 2024 Miracle Mile, 1st G2 Cordina Sprint	9th	x	x	x	x	1st	20	3	2nd
Sure Thing Captain	Shannon Price	19		1st	x	x	1st	x	x	32	11 (2.4)	8th
Tango Tara	Andy Gath	32		5th	x	x	10th	x	x	12	x	x
Tims A Trooper	Grant Dixon	21		x	5th	x	3rd	x	x	21	9 (2.2)	9th
Turn It Up	Shane Graham	22		x	x	6th	12th	x	x	8	x	x
Whereyabinpoppin	James Rattray	31		x	x	10th	x	9th	x	7	x	x
Wisper A Secret	Chantal Turpin	8	1st 2024 Rising Sun, 2nd 2023 QLD Derby	x	x	9th	6th	x	x	11	x	x

== 2024 Inter Dominion (ID24 New South Wales) ==
The 2024 Inter Dominion started on 29 November 2024 at Newcastle. There were 3 rounds scheduled:

- Round 1 with 3 heats for pacers and 2 heats for trotters, all over 2030m from a mobile start.
- Round 2 on Wednesday 4 December 2024 at Bathurst, all heats over 1730m.
- Round 3 on Saturday 7 December 2024 at Tabcorp Park, Menangle, all heats over 2300m.

ID24 was affected by the absence of the previous year's winner Leap To Fame and place getters Better Eclipse and Swayzee.

The Grand Finals were scheduled for Saturday 14 December at Tabcorp Park, Menangle and raced over 2300m. The Grand Final was won by Don Hugo trained and driven by Luke McCarthy from Minstrel and Max Delight.

Horse	Trainer(s)	Final Qual. order	Notes	Heat 1	Heat 2	Heat 3	Heat 4	Heat 5	Heat 6	Heat 7	Heat 8	Heat 9	Points	Barrier draw for Final	Grand Final placing
Ardens Ace	Tony Bertwistle, NSW	28		x	7th	x	x	x	6th	x	10th	x	16	x	x
Blacksadance	Chantal Turpin, QLD	3		x	x	9th	5th	x	x	5th	x	x	20	x	x
Cantfindabettorman	Isabel Walsh, VIC	9	3rd 2023 Chariots of Fire	x	x	1st	x	7th	x	x	x	9th	26	E1	x
Captains Knock	Brad Hewitt, NSW	10	3rd 2024 Chariots of Fire	x	1st	x	3rd	x	x	x	x	1st	43	9	7th
Curly James	Jason Grimson, NSW	6	2nd 2024 Victoria Cup	x	x	2nd	x	x	7th	x	x	3rd	30	5	10th
Cya Art	Jason Grimson, NSW	25		x	x	10th	x	x	3rd	10th	x	x	17	x	x
Dangerous	Shane Sanderson, VIC	35		x	3rd	x	2nd	x	x	x	1st	x	40	2	5th
District Attorney	Jason Grimson, NSW	8	2nd 2024 Kilmore Cup	12th	x	x	x	2nd	x	12th	x	x	15	x	x
Don Hugo	Luke McCarthy, NSW	2		x	5th	x	x	1st	x	1st	x	x	40	3	1st
Don Lou	Seaton Grima, NSW	11		8th	x	x	x	x	x	x	7th	x	16	x	x
Donegal Luther	Amanda Turnbull, NSW	34		11th	x	x	x	12th	x	x	x	12th	4	x	x
Exotic Bushranger	Michael Stanley, VIC	32		10th	x	x	x	11th	x	x	x	11th	7	x	x
Hector	Andy Garth, VIC	19		x	10th	x	7th	x	x	x	4th	x	9	x	x
Helluva	John Justice, VIC	22		x	11th	x	9th	x	x	x	9th	x	6	x	x
I Break The Line	Michael Xuereb, NSW	33		6th	x	x	x	x	10th	x	x	6th	10	x	x
Jilliby Nitro	Peter Rixon, NSW	29		2nd	x	x	6th	x	x	3rd	x	x	31	1	8th
Jimartee	Cristina Monte, QLD	15		x	x	4th	4th	x	x	2nd	x	x	31	7	9th
Kanena Provlima	Kerryann Morris, NSW	16		5th	x	x	x	10th	x	x	x	10th	11	x	x
Mach Dan	Emma Stewart, VIC	5	3rd 2024 Victoria Cup	x	4th	x	x	6th	x	x	x	8th	21	x	x
Mach Da Vinci	Paul Fitzpatrick, NSW	24		x	12th	x	11th	x	x	11th	x	x	5	x	x
Magician	James Rattray, NSW	12		9th	x	x	x	x	4th	8th	x	x	18	x	x
Master Catch	Lisa McDonald, NSW	37		x	x	11th	x	x	9th	4th	x	x	15	x	x
Max Delight	David Aiken, VIC	4	4th ID21, 1st 2021 Victoria Cup, 3rd 2020 Chariots of Fire	3rd	x	x	x	4th	x	x	x	5th	28	10	3rd
Minstrel	Greg & Skye Bond, WA	1	1st 2024 & 3rd 2023 W A Pacing Cup, 2nd 2023 & 1st 2022 Freemantle Cup, 1st 2021 Golden Nugget	1st	x	x	x	x	12th	x	2nd	x	30	11	2nd
My Moonlight Dream	Seaton Grima, NSW	31		x	x	5th	x	x	2nd	x	x	2nd	21	4	12th
Nerano	Jason Grimson, NSW	7	5th ID23	x	6th	x	1st	x	x	x	5th	x	31	8	11th
Nyack	James Rattray, NSW	17		x	9th	x	x	5th	x	x	x	4th	21	x	x
Perfect Stride	Shane Sanderson, VIC	26		4th	x	x	x	x	5th	6th	x	x	24	E2	x
Petes Said So	Kerryann Morris, NSW	21	6th ID22 & 8th 2023 ID23	x	x	6th	x	x	1st	9th	x	x	27	12	6th
Star Major	James Rattray, NSW	18		x	x	7th	10th	x	x	x	11th	x	11	x	x
Tact Macleod	Mark Jones, NZ	23		x	x	SCR	x	x	x	x	x	x	x	x	x
Tenzing Bromac	Greg & Skye Bond, WA	14		x	8th	x	x	8th	x	7th	x	x	16	x	x
Terry	Darren Binskin, NSW	30		x	2nd	x	x	9th	x	x	3rd	x	28	6	4th
Unfazed	Paul Fitzpatrick, NSW	40		7th	x	x	x	3rd	x	x	8th	x	22	x	x
Whereyabinboppin	James Rattray, NSW	13		x	x	3rd	x	x	11th	x	6th	x	20	x	x
Zeus Bromac	Paul Fitzpatrick, NSW	27	5th ID22	x	x	8th	x	x	8th	x	x	7th	16	x	x

== 2023 Inter Dominion (ID23, Brisbane) ==
The 2023 Inter Dominion started on 1 December 2023 at Albion Park, the venue for the whole series which is a 1019m left-handed all weather track. There were 3 rounds scheduled:

- Round 1 with 4 heats for pacers (9 starters maximum per heat) and 3 heats for trotters (12 starters maximum per heat), all over 1660m from a mobile start.
- Round 2 with 3 heats is raced on Tuesday 5 December over 2138m.
- Round 3 with 3 heats on Saturday 9 December over 2680m.

The Grand finals were raced over 2680m on Saturday 16 December.

Two of the leading contenders Leap To Fame and Swayzee were half siblings. They were by different sires: Bettor's Delight and Rock N Roll Heaven (USA) respectively, but both were out of Lettucereason (Art Major, USA) the sister of For A Reason and winner of 17 races herself. Both Leap To Fame and Swayzee were bred by Paul Kahlefeldt at Redbank Lodge Standardbreds in Wagga, New South Wales.

The grand final was won by Leap To Fame (trained and driven by Grant Dixon) from Better Eclipse (Jess Tubbs & Greg Sugars) and Swayzee (Jason Grimson & Cameron Hart) third. The pacers consolation race was won by Cantfindabettorman, trained by Belinda McCarthy and driven by Luke McCarthy, from Blacksadance (Chantal Turpin/Pete McMullen) and Targaryen (Jack Butler/Chloe Butler).

Horse	Trainer(s)	Final Qual. order	Notes	Heat 1	Heat 2	Heat 3	Heat 4	Heat 5	Heat 6	Heat 7	Heat 8	Heat 9	Heat 10	Points	Barrier draw for Final	Grand Final placing
Better Eclipse	Jess Tubbs (VIC)	5	7th ID22, 1st 2022 Chariots of Fire	x	1st	x	x	x	2nd	x	x	1st	x	42	11 (2.4)	2nd
Betterzippit	Jason Grimson (NSW)	11		x	4th	x	x	x	x	11th	x	x	x	8	x	x
Blacksadance	Chantal Turpin (QLD)	8		x	x	8th	x	x	4th	x	9th	x	x	15	x	x
Cantfindabettorman	Belinda McCarthy (NSW)	14	3rd Chariots of Fire	x	x	6th	x	5th	x	x	x	x	3rd	23	x E1	x
Captain Shuffles	Ben Crosby (QLD)	28		x	3rd	x	x	x	10th	x	x	x	8th	16	x	x
Classie Washington	Darren Garrard (QLD)	32		x	2nd	x	x	x	x	4th	x	2nd	x	32	8 (2.1)	12th
Deus Ex	Jack Butler (QLD)	17		x	x	3rd	x	6th	x	x	x	7th	x	21	x	x
Future Assured	Trent Dawson (QLD)	12		1st	x	x	x	4th	x	x	5th	x	x	30	4	9th
Helluva	John Justice (VIC)	19		x	x	9th	x	x	8th	x	x	x	6th	13	x	x
Hot And Treacherous	Jack Butler (QLD)	7		x	x	x	4th	x	x	3rd	8th	x	x	19	x	x
I Cast No Shadow	Daniel Graham (QLD)	1	1st ID22	5th	x	x	x	x	11th	x	x	10th	x	10	x	x
Kanena Provlima	Kerryann Morris (NSW)	24		3rd	x	x	x	x	6th	x	x	3rd	x	26	7	7th
Kosimo	Darrel Graham (VIC)	33		x	x	x	8th	x	x	12th	x	x	x	3	x	x
Leap To Fame	Grant Dixon (QLD)	4	3rd in the 2023 Victoria Cup	x	x	1st	x	x	x	1st	x	x	1st	45	6	1st
Little Bliss	Troy Williams (NSW)	36		x	x	x	9th	x	x	9th	10th	x	x	8	x	x
L L Cool J	Shane Graham (QLD)	22		x	6th	x	x	x	x	7th	x	5th	x	18	x	x
Make Mine Memphis	Gemma Hewitt (QLD)	25		x	x	4th	x	x	x	8th	x	9th	x	15	x	x
Manila Playboy	Shane Fraser (QLD)	21		x	x	x	2nd	x	5th	x	x	x	9th	22	x	x
Miracle Moose	Grant Dixon (QLD)	40		x	7th	x	x	10th	x	x	11th	x	x	8	x	x
Mr Mclaren	Chantal Turpin (QLD)	29		x	x	x	7th	12th	x	x	x	x	r	4	x	x
Nerano	Jason Grimson (NSW)	20		x	x	2nd	x	x	1st	x	1st	x	x	42	1	5th
Northview Hustler	Al Barnes (QLD)	27		8th	x	x	x	8th	x	x	7th	x	x	13	x	x
Our Money Rocks	David Thorn (NSW)	18		x	x	x	5th	x	x	3rd	4th	x	x	25	13 (2.6)	10th
Petes Said So	Kerryann Morris (NSW)	16	6th ID22	x	5th	x	x	2nd	X	x	x	x	2nd	31	12 (2.5)	8th
Rock N Roll Doo	Michael Stanley (VIC)	3	1st in 2022 Victoria Cup, 4th in 2023 Victoria Cup	7th	x	x	x	11th	x	x	x	x	x	5	x	x
Send It	Shane Graham (QLD)	31		x	x	5th	x	7th	x	x	x	x	5th	19	x	x
Speak The Truth	Shannon Price (QLD)	15		x	x	7th	x	1st	x	x	3rd	x	x	30	10 (2.3)	6th
Spirit Of St Louis	Belinda McCarthy (NSW)	6		6th	x	x	x	x	X	2nd	2nd	x	x	30	9 (2.2)	4th
Swayzee	Jason Grimson (NSW)	2	1st in 2023 New Zealand Trotting Cup	x	x	x	1st	3rd	x	x	x	4th	x	33	3	3rd
Tairlaw Toll	Chantal Turpin (QLD)	38		x	9th	x	x	x	x	6th	x	11th	x	10	x	x
Targaryen	Jack Butler (QLD)	39		4th	x	x	x	x	7th	x	x	x	4th	21	x	x
Tims A Trooper	Grant Dixon (QLD)	13		x	x	x	6th	x	9th	x	x	6th	x	15	x	x
Tiz A Sizzler	Darrel Graham (QLD)	30		x	8th	x	x	9th	x	x	x	x	7th	12	x	x
Tommy Lincoln	Mark Dux (QLD)	26		2nd	x	x	x	x	x	10th	x	8th	x	18	x	x
Turn It Up	Shane Graham (QLD)	9		x	x	x	3rd	x	3rd	x	6th	x	x	26	2	11th
Uptown Beachgirl	Donny Smith (QLD)	23		9th	x	x	x	x	x	x	x	x	x	1	x	x

== 2022 Inter Dominion (ID22, Victoria) ==
The 2022 Inter Dominion started on 26 November 2022 at Ballarat with 3 heats each for pacers and trotters, all run over 2200m. The second night, Tuesday 29 November, was at Shepparton and the heats are 1690m. The third night, 3 December, was at Geelong and the races were 2570m. The points awarded during the heats were: 1st (16 points), 2nd (13), 3rd (11), 4th (9), 5th (8), 6th (7), 7th (6), 8th (5), 9th (4), 10th (3), 11th (2) and 12th (1).

On 10 December the finals were held at Melton and each race run over 2760m. The stake for the Pacing heats was $30,000 while the Consolation race was $50,000 and the Grand Final $500,000.

The ID22 Grand Final was won by I Cast No Shadow (NZ) trained by Jason Grimson and driven by Cameron Hart. I Cast No Shadow was bred at Bromac Lodge in New Zealand, out of the Falcon Seelster mare Ragazza Bromac (NZ) sired by Shadow Play (USA).

Torrid Saint trained by Julie Douglas and driven by Jack Laugher was second with Act Now trained by Emma Stewart and driven by Jodi Quinlan third. Jilliby Sylvester trained by Margaret Lee and driven by Glen Craven won the Pacers Consolation.

Horse	Trainer(s)	Final Qual. order	Notes	Heat 1	Heat 2	Heat 3	Heat 4	Heat 5	Heat 6	Heat 7	Heat 8	Heat 9	Points	Barrier draw for Final	Grand Final placing
Act Now	Emma Stewart	20		1st	x	x	3rd	x	x	x	1st	x	43	3	3rd
AGs White Socks	Belinda McCarthy	23		x	x	3rd	x	12th	x	x	x	9th	16	x	x
Alta Orlando	Belinda McCarthy	15	3rd ID21 & 4th 2022 Blacks A Fake Queensland Championship	x	4th	x	x	x	9th	5th	x	x	21	x	x
Better Eclipse	Jess Tubbs	4	1st 2022 Chariots of Fire, 2nd Rising Sun, 3rd Miracle Mile & Victoria Cup	x	x	1st	x	x	4th	11th	x	x	27	8 Unruly	7th
Bettor Be The Bomb	Basil Dooley	21		x	10th	x	x	4th	x	x	x	11th	14	x	x
Bettor Call Me	Matthew Craven	31		x	7th	x	x	x	5th	7th	x	x	20	x	x
Beyond Delight	Emma Stewart	26	4th 2022 Chariots of Fire & 5th The Rising Sun	x	5th	x	x	2nd	x	x	5th	x	29	5	SCR
Boncel Benjamin	Ryan Duffy	1	1st ID21	x	x	12th	x	10th	x	x	x	12th	5	x	x
Bulletproof Boy	Scott Ewen	19		8th	x	x	x	x	8th	8th	x	x	15	x	x
Bundoran	Amanda Turnbull	17		x	x	6th	x	x	2nd	x	2nd	x	33	7	9th
Crime Writer	Matthew Craven	32		12th	x	x	x	7th	x	x	x	6th	14	x	x
Expensive Ego	Belinda McCarthy	14	2nd ID21, 1st Chariots of Fire	2nd	x	x	2nd	x	x	x	3rd	x	37	6	8th
Focus Strike	David Miles	29		9th	x	x	x	x	SCR	x	x	x	4	x	x
Honolua Bay	Emma Stewart	13	2nd 2022 Victoria Cup	x	1st	x	x	x	1st	1st	x	x	48	2	4th
Huli Nien	John Justice	28		7th	x	x	12th	x	x	x	x	7th	13	x	x
I Cast No Shadow	Jason Grimson	4		x	x	4th	8th	x	x	x	x	3rd	25	1	1st
Jilliby Nitro	Margaret Lee	38		x	8th	x	11th	x	x	x	9th	x	11	x	x
Jilliby Sylvester	Margaret Lee	33		11th	x	x	x	x	7th	6th	x	x	15	x	x
Like A Wildfire	Emma Stewart	16		x	x	7th	6th	x	x	x	10th	x	16	x	x
Long Fellow	Emma Stewart	4		10th	x	x	x	x	11th	10th	x	x	8	x	x
Mach Dan	Emma Stewart	4		3rd	x	x	1st	x	x	x	x	1st	43	12 (2.4)	10th
Majestic Cruiser	Jason Grimson	1	6th ID21, 1st 2022 Blacks A Fake Queensland Championship	x	3rd	x	x	x	6th	x	7th	x	24	x	x
Max Delight	David Aitken	1	4th ID21, 1st 2021 Victoria Cup, 3rd 2020 Chariots of Fire	x	x	11th	x	x	3rd	9th	x	x	17	x	x
Mona Mia	Kari Males	37		x	12th	x	10th	x	x	x	12th	x	5	x	x
Narutac Prince	Emma Stewart	30		x	x	2nd	x	3rd	x	x	x	8th	29	10 (2.2)	11th
Perfect Stride	Jack Trainor	25		x	x	8th	x	8th	x	2nd	x	x	23	x	x
Petes Said So	Kerryann Morris	27		5th	x	x	5th	x	x	x	x	2nd	29	13 (2.5)	6th
Pitch Perfect	Roy Roots Jnr	36		x	x	10th	x	x	10th	x	x	4th	15	x	x
Sicario	Brent Lilley	34		x	11th	x	x	11th	x	x	11th	x	6	x	x
Spirit Of St Louis	Belinda McCarthy	4	8th ID21, 2nd 2022 A G Hunter Cup, Miracle Mile and Blacks A Fake Queensland Championship	x	6th	x	x	1st	x	x	x	10th	26	4	12th
Tango Tara	Andy Gath	24		x	SCR	x	x	x	x	x	x	x	x	x	x
The Black Prince	Roy Roots Jnr	4		4th	x	x	9th	x	x	x	4th	x	22	x	x
To Fast To Serious	Dylan Egerton-Green	22		x	x	9th	x	9th	x	x	6th	x	15	x	x
Torrid Saint	Julie Douglas	18		x	x	5th	x	5th	x	4th	x	x	25	10 (2.1) E1	2nd
Triple Eight	Jess Tubbs	4		x	9th	x	x	6th	x	x	x	5th	19	x	x
Wolf Stride	Jack Trainor	4		6th	x	x	4th	x	x	x	8th	x	21	x	x
Zeuss Bromac	Paul Fitzpatrick	4	2nd 2021 Chariots of Fire	x	2nd	x	7th	x	x	3rd	x	x	30	11 (2.3)	5th

== 2021 Inter Dominion (ID21, New South Wales) ==
There was no Inter Dominion in 2020. The 2021 Inter Dominions were held from Saturday 27 November 2021 to 11 December 2021. The first round of heats and the finals were held at Menangle Park Paceway while the second and third rounds of heats were at Bathurst and Newcastle respectively.

Due to COVID-19 a significant number of horses, particularly from New Zealand, were unable to compete.

Expensive Ego was first past the post but Boncel Benjamin was promoted to first.

Horse	Trainer(s)	Final Qual. order	Notes	Heat 1 (points)	Heat 2 (points)	Heat 3 (points)	Heat 4 (points)	Heat 5 (points)	Heat 6 (points)	Heat 7 (points)	Heat 8 (points)	Heat 9 (points)	Points	Barrier draw for Final	Grand Final
King Of Swing	Belinda McCarthy, NSW	1	1st 2020 A.G. Hunter Cup, 2020 & 2021 Miracle Mile	1st (16)	x	x	x	x	1st (16)	x	1st (16)	x	48	11 (2.3)	5th
Max Delight	David Aitken, Vic	2	1st 2021 Victoria Cup, 3rd 2020 Chariots of Fire	x	4th (9)	x	x	x	3rd (11)	2nd (13)	x	x	33	12 (2.2)	4th
Triple Eight NZ	Jess Tubbs, Vic	3		x	x	4th (9)	2nd (13)	x	x	x	3rd (11)	x	33	4	12th
The Black Prince NZ	Roy Roots Junior, NSW	4		x	x	9th (4)	3rd (11)	x	x	x	4th (9)	x	24	8	SCR
Expensive Ego	Belinda McCarthy, NSW	6	1st 2021 Chariots of Fire	x	1st (16)	x	1st (16)	x	x	x	x	1st (16)	48	1	2nd
Alta Orlando NZ	Belinda McCarthy, NSW	8		x	2nd (13)	x	x	2nd (13)	x	x	6th (7)	x	34	9 (2.1)	3rd
Mach Dan	Emma Stewart, Vic	10		5th (8)	x	x	x	7th (6)	x	x	x	3rd (11)	25	2	SCR
Ignatus	James Rattray, NSW	11		10th (3)	x	x	x	4th (9)	x	x	x	6th (7)	19	x	x
Malcolms Rhythm	David Aitken, Vic	12		x	x	1st (16)	x	3rd (11)	x	x	x	7th (6)	33	3	9th
Majestic Cruiser	Jason Grimson, NSW	13		2nd (13)	x	x	4th (9)	x	x	x	x	5th (8)	30	6	6th
Mach Da Vinci NZ	Peter Hanson, NSW	15		x	5th (8)	x	9th (4)	x	x	5th (8)	x	x	20	x	x
Western Sonador	S J Donoghue & R K Bartley, Vic	17		x	x	10th (3)	x	x	6th (7)	7th (6)	x	x	16	x	x
Burnham Boy NZ	Kevin Pizzuto, NSW	18		9th (4)	x	x	11th (2)	x	x	x	7th (6)	x	12	x	x
Rockin Marty	David Hewitt, NSW	20		x	9th (4)	x	x	10th (3)	x	x	x	SCR	7	x	x
Loorrim Lake	Kevin Pizzuto, NSW	21		x	x	5th (8)	x	x	4th (9)	8th (5)	x	x	22	x	x
Our Uncle Sam	Chris Frisby, NSW	22		7th (6)	x	x	5th (8)	x	x	x	x	2nd (13)	27	14 (2.5)	11th
Robyns Playboy NZ	S Wilson, NZ	23		x	12th (1)	x	x	12th (1)	x	SCR	x	x	2	x	x
Ellmers Image NZ	Amanda Turnbull, NSW	24		x	x	7th (6)	10th (3)	x	x	x	x	10th (3)	12	x	x
Spirit Of St Louis NZ	Belinda McCarthy, NSW	26		x	x	2nd (13)	x	1st (16)	x	3rd (11)	x	x	40	5	8th
Atomic Red	Steve Turnbull, NSW	27		12th (1)	x	x	12th (1)	x	x	x	x	SCR	2	x	x
Bundoran NZ	Amanda Turnbull, NSW	28		6th (7)	x	x	x	x	5th (8)	1st (16)	x	x	31	15 (2.6)	10th
Balraj NZ	Jack Trainor, NSW	29		x	3rd (11)	x	x	5th (8)	x	x	2nd (13)	x	32	13 (2.4)	7th
Pocket Of Terror	Jack Trainor, NSW	32		x	x	6th (7)	6th (7)	x	x	x	x	8th (5)	19	x	x
Line Up NZ	Darren Binskin, NSW	35		x	x	3rd (11)	x	x	11th (2)	10th (3)	x	x	16	x	x
Boncel Benjamin	Jason Grimson, NSW	36		3rd (11)	x	x	x	x	2nd (13)	9th (4)	x	x	28	7	1st
Bright Energy	Belinda McCarthy, NSW	37		x	x	11th (2)	x	11th (2)	x	x	5th (8)	x	12	x	x
Alpine Stride	Darren Binskin, NSW	38		x	7th (6)	x	x	6th (7)	x	x	7th (6)	x	19	x	x
Pump The Brakes	Sean Grayson, NSW	39		12th (1)	x	x	x	9th (4)	x	x	x	4th (9)	14	x	x
Reactor Now	David Aiken, Vic	42		8th (5)	x	x	7th (6)	x	x	x	11th (2)	x	14	x	x
Rusty Crackers	Jason Grimson, NSW	43		x	8th (5)	x	x	8th (5)	x	x	10th (3)	x	13	x	x
Cant Refuse NZ	Corey Paterson, NSW	50		x	10th (3)	x	8th (5)	x	x	11th (2)	x	x	10	x	x
I Cast No Shadow NZ	Brent Lilley, Vic	51		x	x	8th (5)	x	x	SCR	x	x	x	5	x	x
Royal Gamble NZ	Mark Callaghan, NSW	53		11th (2)	x	x	x	x	8th (5)	4th (9)	x	x	16	x	x
Aphorism	Chris Frisby, NSW	54		x	11th (2)	x	x	x	7th (6)	x	8th (5)	x	13	x	x
Make Mine Memphis	Vicki Rasmussen, Qld	55		x	6th (7)	x	x	x	10th (3)	x	x	SCR	10	x	x
Arden Messi NZ	Kevin Pizzuto, NSW	56		4th (9)	x	x	x	x	9th (4)	6th (7)	x	x	20	x	x

Horses that were in the final rankings but did not compete included:

- 5 - Father Bob - Mark Fletcher, NSW
- 7 - Ride High - Clayton Tonkin, Vic
- 9 - Out To Play - Emma Stewart, Vic
- 14 - San Carlo - S J Donoghue & R K Bartley, Vic
- 16 - Code Bailey NZ - Margaret Lee, Vic
- 19 - Colt Thirty One - Grant Dixon, Qld
- 25 - Zeuss Bromac NZ - Paul Fitzpatrick, NSW
- 30 - Perfect Stride NZ - Russell Jack, Vic
- 31 - Jilliby Chevy - Margaret Lee, Vic
- 33 - Mister Brazil - Adam Ruggari, NSW
- 34 - Blacksadance - Chantal Turpin, Qld

== 2019 Inter Dominion (ID19, Auckland) ==
The 2019 Inter Dominions were held in Auckland, New Zealand, hosted by the Auckland Trotting Club at the Alexandra Park track from Friday 29 November 2019 to 15 December 2019.

Spankem who was one of the favourite contenders for the Interdoms was withdrawn due to a fetlock injury diagnosed following Christchurch cupweek.

Heats 1 and 2 on Friday 29 November were raced over 2200m with a mobile start and Free-for-all conditions.

- Heat 1 was won by Ultimate Sniper (Natalie Rasmussen, $2.50) from Chase Auckland (Tim Williams) and Mach Shard (Zachary Butcher) in 2:35.4 (mile rate 1:53.6).
- Heat 2 was carried out by A G's White Socks (Maurice McKendry MNZM, $29.60) from Cruz Bromac (Mark Purdon) and Thefixer (Natalie Rasmussen) in 2:36.1 (mile rate 1:54.2).

Heat 3 and 4 on Tuesday 3 December were raced over 1700m.

- Heat 3 was won by A G's White Socks (Maurice McKendry, $6.40) from Chase Auckland (Tim Williams) and My Kiwi Mate (Craig Demmler) in 1:59.17 (mile rate 1:52.7).
- Heat 4 was won by Ultimate Sniper (Natalie Rasmussen, $2.80) from Cruz Bromac (Mark Purdon) and Mach Shard (Zac Butcher) in 1:59.01 (mile rate 1:52.6).

Heat 5 and 6 on Friday 6 December were raced over 2700m.

- Heat 5 was won by Ultimate Sniper (Natalie Rasmussen, $1.50) from Chase Auckland (Tim Williams) and Colt Thirty One (Grant Dixon) in 3:16.11 (mile rate 1:56.8).
- Heat 6 was won by Cruz Bromac (Mark Purdon, $2.70) from Thefixer (Natalie Rasmussen) and Triple Eight (David Butcher) in 3:16.7 (mile rate 1:57.2).

The Grand final (2700m) was raced on 14 December and won by Ultimate Sniper (Natalie Rasmussen) in 3:14.7 (1:56.0) from Mach Shard (Zac Butcher) and Thefixer (Blair Orange). The 4 year old Ultimate Sniper went through the series undefeated.

The horse Triple Eight was number 8 in the final, drawn 8 and was placed 8th.

Horse	Trainer(s)	Final Qual. order	Notes	Heat 1	Heat 2	Heat 3	Heat 4	Heat 5	Heat 6	Points after night 1	Points after night 2	Points after night 3	Barrier draw for Final	Grand Final
Ultimate Sniper	Purdon / Rasmussen	9	1st 2019 NZ Derby and 2018 NZ Sires Stakes 3yo Final	1st	x	x	1st	1st	x	17	34	51	5	1st
Cruz Bromac	Purdon / Rasmussen	1	1st 2019 NZ Cup and 2018 NZ FFA	x	2nd	x	2nd	x	1st	14	28	45	11	4th
A G's White Socks	Barry Purdon	12	1st 2018 Easter HC and Noel Taylor Mile	x	1st	1st	x	x	5th	17	34	43	7	5th
Chase Auckland	Purdon / Rasmussen	3	1st 2019 NZ FFA and New Brighton Cup	2nd	x	2nd	x	2nd	x	14	28	43	9	10th
Thefixer	Purdon / Rasmussen	4	1st 2018 NZ Cup	x	3rd	5th	x	x	2nd	12	21	35	13	3rd
Mach Shard	Barry Purdon	17		3rd	x	x	3rd	6th	x	12	24	32	6	2nd
My Kiwi Mate	Craig Demmler	14		7th	x	3rd	x	x	7th	7	19	26	1	9th
Sicario	Brent Lilley	15	2019 South Australian Pacing Cup	x	7th	6th	x	x	4th	7	15	25	2	7th
Ashley Locaz	Purdon / Rasmussen	10	2nd 2019 Chariots of Fire	6th	x	7th	x	4th	x	8	15	25	3	6th
San Carlo	O'Donoghue / Bartley	8	1st 2019 Kilmore Cup	5th	x	x	6th	7th	x	9	17	24	10	11th
Triple Eight	Steve Telfer	13		x	6th	x	10th	x	3rd	8	12	24	8	8th
On The Cards	Barry Purdon	20		x	5th	10th	x	5th	x	9	13	22	4	12th
Classie Brigade	Robert Dunn	7	1st 2019 Kaikoura Cup	x	8th	x	4th	x	9th	6	16	21	12 (E1)	Scratched
Solid Gold	Cooney / Hopkins	22		4th	x	8th	x	10th	x	10	16	20	x	x
Bling It On	Belinda McCarthy	5	1st 2019 Victoria Cup	x	10th	x	5th	x	11th	4	13	16	x	x
Dance Time	Steve Telfer	25		x	11th	4th	x	12th	x	3	13	15	x	x
Star Galleria	Steven Reid	16	2018 City of Auckland FFA winner	x	4th	x	12th	x	8th	10	12	18	x	x
Conviction	Steve Turnbull	19		8th	x	x	11th	13th	x	6	9	10	x	x
Our Uncle Sam	Chris Frisby	6		10th	x	x	9th	8th	x	4	9	15	x	x
Check In	Steve Telfer	24		11th	x	9th	x	11th	x	3	8	11	x	x
The Devils Own	Brent Mangos	23		12th	x	x	7th	x	10th	2	9	13	x	x
Another Masterpiece	Purdon / Rasmussen	18		x	12th	x	8th	x	6th	2	8	15	x	x
Atomic Red	Steve Turnbull	21		x	9th	12th	x	x	12th	5	7	9	x	x
Colt Thirty One	Grant Dixon	2	1st 2019 Swan Hill Cup	9th	x	13th	x	3rd	x	5	6	18	x	x
Henry Hubert	Robert Dunn	11		13th	x	11th	x	9th	x	1	4	9	x	x
Ball of Art	Barry Purdon	26		x	x	x	x	x	x	x	x	x	x	x

== 1952 Inter-Dominion racebook ==
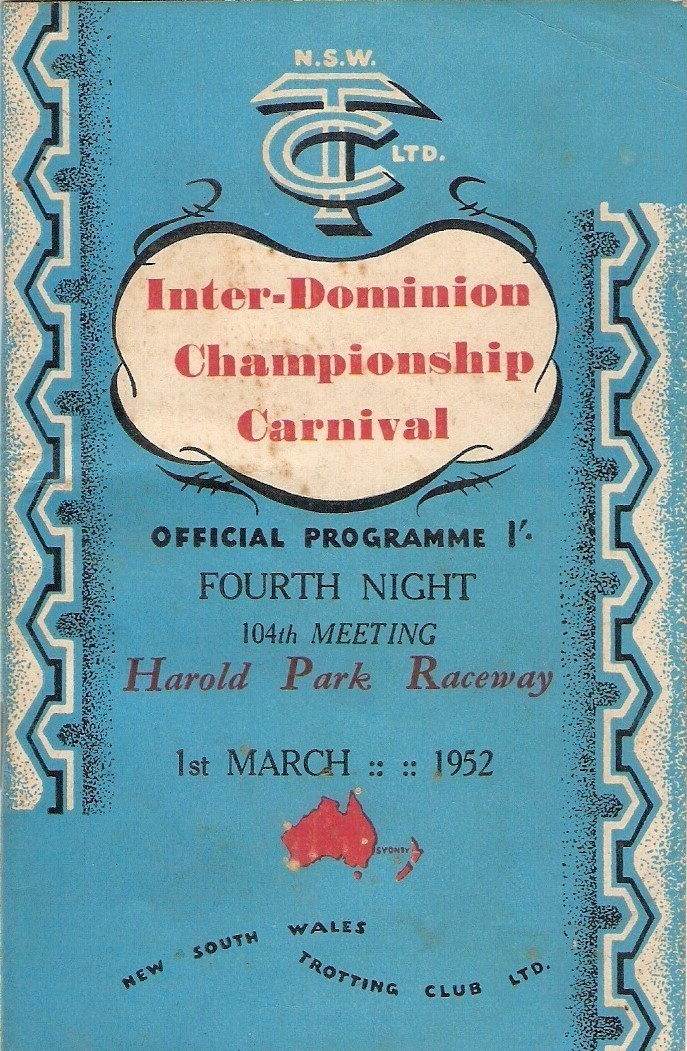
Front cover of the 1952 Harold Park Inter-Dominion Final racebook

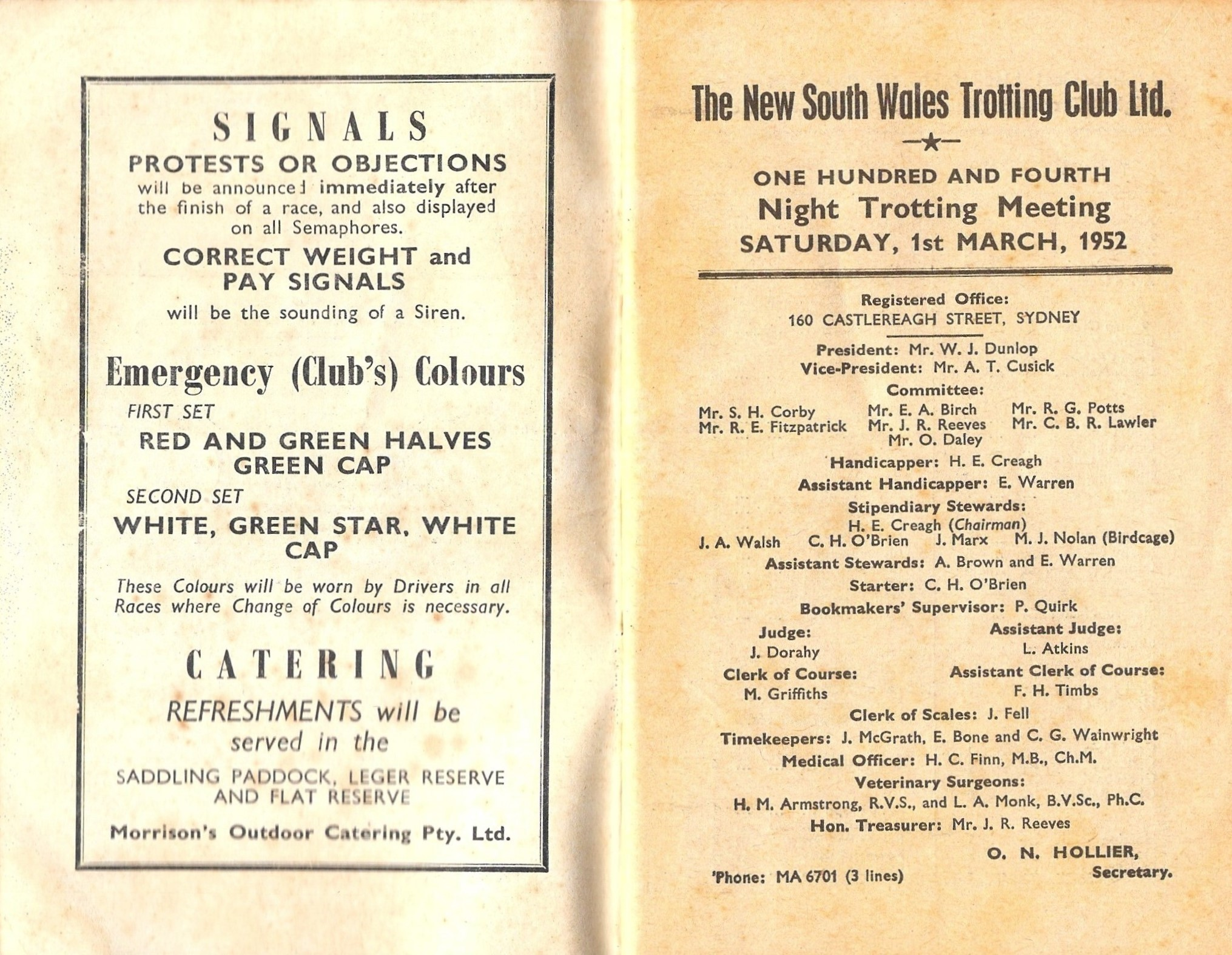
Inside cover showing race night officials

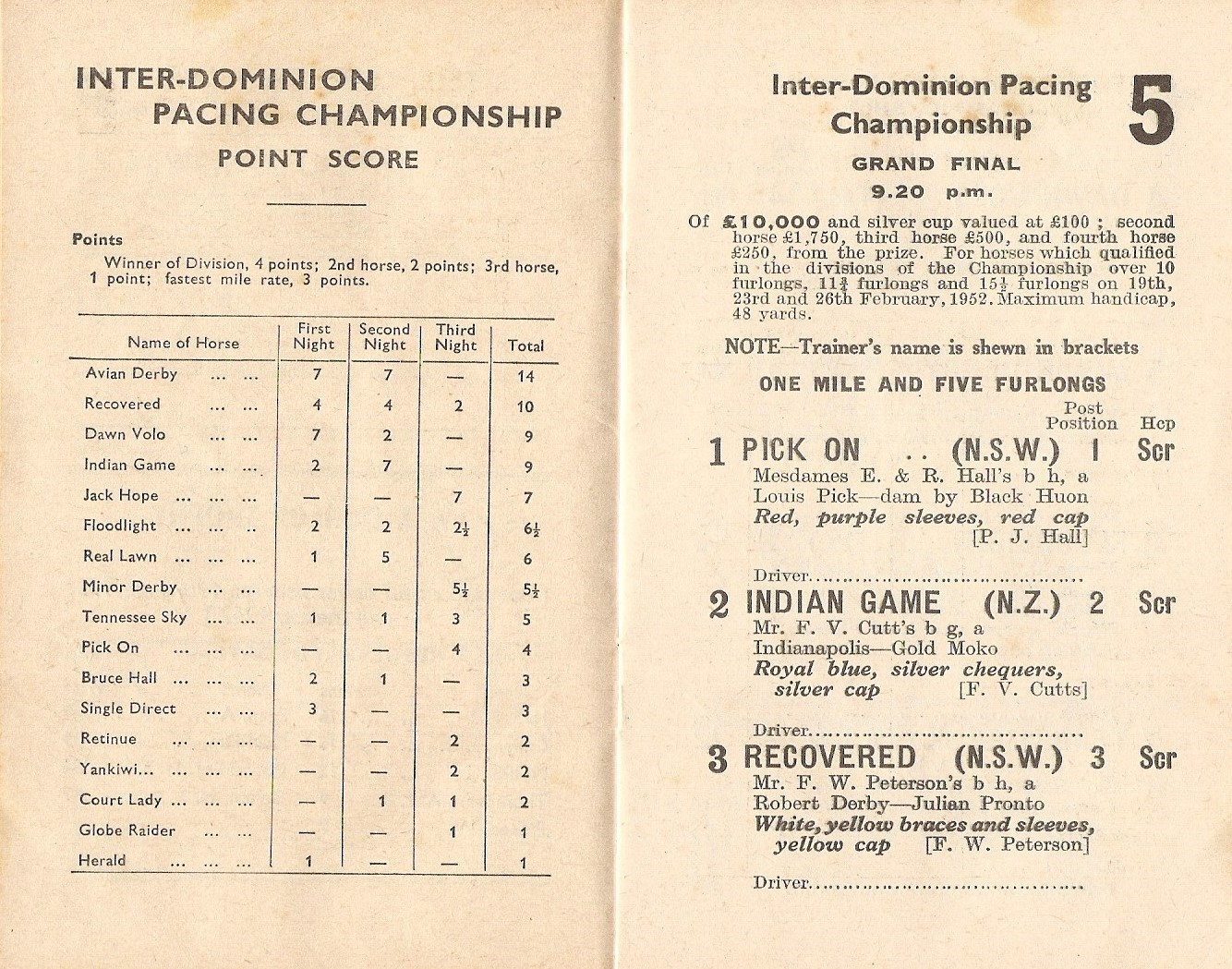
Racebook showing starters & conditions

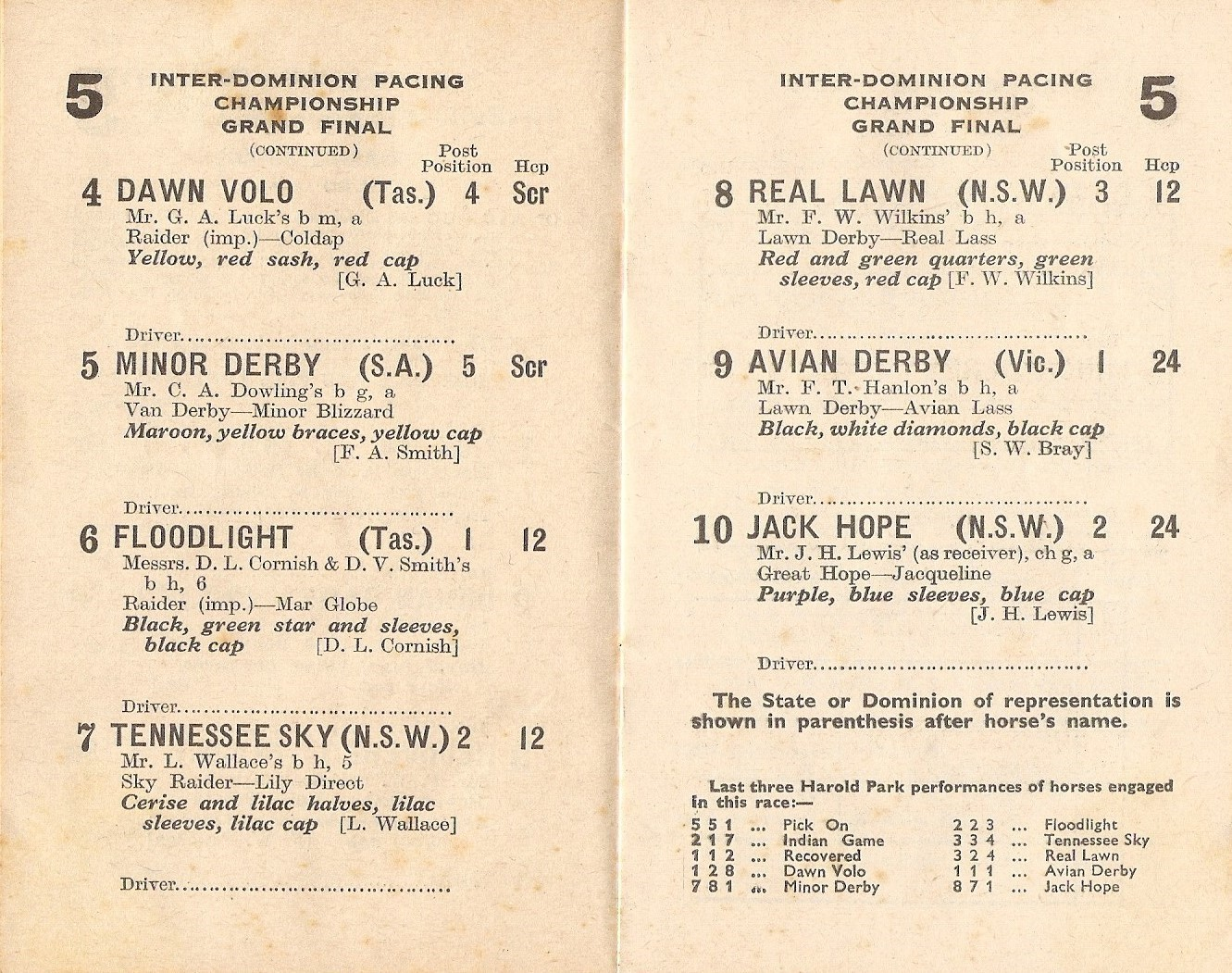
Racebook showing starters & the winner, Avian Derby

== See also ==
- Harness racing in Australia
- Harness racing in New Zealand
