= Gammalite =

Australian Standardbred racehorse

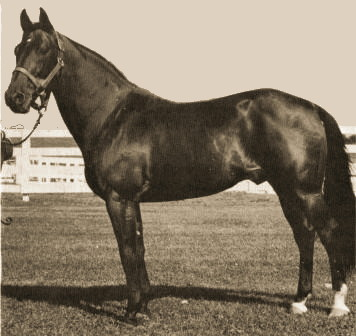
- Adios (USA), the grandsire of Gammalite.
- Breed: Standardbred
- Discipline: Pacing
- Sire: Thor Hanover (USA)
- Grandsire: Adios
- Dam: High Valley
- Maternal grandsire: Intangible (USA)
- Sex: Stallion
- Foaled: 1976
- Country: Australia
- Color: Chestnut
- Breeder: Leo and Maureen O'Connor
- Owner: Leo and Maureen O'Connor
- Trainer: Leo O'Connor

Record
- 179 starts, 94 wins

Earnings
- $1,386,480

Major wins
- Group one wins: 1979 Vic Tatlow Memorial; 1980 SA Derby; 1981 Qld Pacing Championship; 1982, 1983, 1984, 1985 SA Cup; 1982 A G Hunter Cup; 1982 NZ Auckland Trotting Cup; 1983 WA Pacing Cup; 1983, 1984 Inter Dominion Pacing Championship; 1983 NSW Harold Park Cup; 1983 Vic Cranbourne Cup; 1984 WA Fremantle Cup

Awards
- 1982, 1983 & 1984 Australasian Pacers Grand Circuit Champion; 1984 Stake Earner of the Year (Pacers) (Aust.); 1982 & 1984 Australian 4YO+ Pacer of the Year

Honors
- 1982, 1984 Australian Harness Horse of the Year; 1st Australian Standardbred to win $1m. Gammalite Cup at Terang racecourse
- Last updated on: 20 August 2011.

Gammalite (1976 – 21 December 2006) was an Australian bred Standardbred racehorse who was the first Standardbred to win A$1 million in Australia. He was regarded as one of Australia's most successful pacers with 16 Group one wins. He won the Inter Dominion Championship twice and was inducted into the Inter Dominion Hall of Fame.

He was bred, owned and trained by Leo and Maureen O'Connor of Terang. Gammalite was foaled in 1976 and was sired by Thor Hanover (USA) and his dam was High Valley by Intangible (USA). High Valley produced 13 foals, the best of which were Alphalite, (winner of twenty three races, including the Victoria Derby), Amative (13 races), Betalite (15 races), The Rogue (22 races), and Omega Valley (12 races).

== Racing record ==
Gammalite's trainer was Leo O'Connor and his regular driver was Bruce Clarke, who drove him to 65 wins.

=== Two-year-old season ===
Gammalite was unplaced in two of his first three two-year-old race starts, before recording ten successive wins including the Victoria Breeders Plate and the Edgar Tatlow Memorial Stakes both at Moonee Valley. He also placed in the Youthful and Sapling Stakes at Moonee Valley. He finished his two-year-old season with eighteen starts for 11 wins and 5 placings for earnings of $41,003 – second only in the national standings for two-year-olds to San Simeon.

=== Three-year-old season ===
At three Gammalite travelled to Western Australia, NSW, Queensland and South Australia trying to win a Derby. He did win the Group one (G1) South Australian Derby, was 2nd to San Simeon in the West Australian Derby and Quamby's Pride in the Queensland Derby and placed 3rd in the Australian and Victorian Derbies. During the season he had 20 race starts for 12 wins and earnings of $49,240, being only unplaced twice in 38 starts.

=== Four-year-old season ===
In the 1980–81 season Gammalite had 28 starts for 16 wins including the $60,000 Craven Filter Championship in Brisbane which was also the last race start for Paleface Adios, and the $40,000 New South Wales Spring Cup for a season's total of $216,765. He now had accumulated 48 successive race wins or placings before finishing fourth at Harold Park and had taken his lifetime earnings to $307,008.

=== Five-year-old season ===
Gammalite had two wins and three seconds in the 1981/82 season before he was taken across the Tasman Sea for racing at the New Zealand Cup meetings. He finished fifth in the New Zealand Trotting Cup, fourth in the New Zealand Free For All and second in the Matson FFA. He also recorded a mile in a time trial of 1:56.1, the third fastest by an Australian pacer. Back in Australia Gammalite won the first of his four G1 South Australian Cups at Globe Derby Park, in Adelaide, and the Lady Brooks Cup at Moonee Valley. He flew to Wellington, changed planes and proceeded to Auckland, arriving there at 2am the day of the Auckland Trotting Cup. In the cup five-year-old Gammalite fought on courageously to defeat Bonnie's Chance by a head in 3:24.6, a national record for a stallion for mobile start over 2,700 metres, but not equalling Delightful Lady's 3:22.9 of the previous year. Gammalite won the $100,000 1982 A G Hunter Cup over 2,870 metres and the FFA Marathon over 3,300 metres, both contested at Moonee Valley. In Queensland Gammalite had four starts for one win and three placings including a third in the Queensland Championship. Gammalite had 28 race starts for fifteen wins and ten placings with earnings of $260,900 for the season.

=== Six-year-old season ===
At six years old during the 1982/83 season Gammalite had eight starts at Moonee Valley, Bankstown and Harold Park for one win and three placings. When taken to Perth, his form improved for wins in two FFA's, the Fremantle Cup, plus two heats and the Final of the $136,000 WA Cup at Gloucester Park. Returning eastwards to Harold Park he won the Harold Park Cup and SA Cup in Adelaide.

After Gammalite's win in the G1 Cranbourne Cup on 28 February 1983 he was flown to Auckland for his first attempt at the Inter Dominion Pacing Championship. Popular Alm, who had won ten of his eleven clashes with Gammalite, was an Inter Dominion Grand Final contestant, too. In the running of the race Popular Alm drifted off course on the home turn allowing Gammalite to come through and defeat him by two and a quarter lengths to win the race.

Gammalite finished the season with 13 wins and 12 placings for earnings of $405,340.

=== Six-year-old season ===
In 1983/84, the seven-year-old Gammalite had wins at Bankstown, Fairfield, Bulli and Harold Park early in the season including the Golden Mile and the Bankstown Club Cup. In his Golden Mile win he became the first Australian Standardbred to win more than a million dollars. Heading for Perth again Gammalite missed out on the WA Cup but won the G1 $60,000 1984 Fremantle Cup on 27 January 1984 before returning to Adelaide for the 1984 Inter Dominion Championship.

Gammalite was defeated on the first night by Bundanoon, but won his next two heats and then won the Grand Final from Thor Lobell and Bundanoon. He became the fourth pacer to win the Inter Dominion Championship twice, and thus qualify for the Inter Dominion Hall of Fame. He then won his third South Australian Cup, the Lady Brooks Cup at Moonee Valley, and the Lord Mayors Cup at Harold Park.

=== Seven-year-old season ===
Gammalite had a further 24 race starts during the 1984/85 season which included wins at Bankstown, Tweed Heads, and the Gold Coast. He then had his fourth win in the G1 $100,000 SA Cup, followed by a win in the Ballarat Pacing Cup. In November 1984 Gammalite was taken to New Zealand but his three starts there only resulted in a 7th, 6th and 11th.

Attempting to win his third Inter Dominion Championship at Moonee Valley in 1985 Gammalite raced for two thirds and a win in the Qualifying Divisions. In the Grand Final he finished fourth to Preux Chevalier.

=== Summary ===
Gammalite won most of the mainland Grand Circuit and Group races except the Miracle Mile Pace. He had 179 starts for 94 wins and 53 seconds, with gross earnings of $1,386,480. He only defeated Popular Alm twice in their 17 meetings. His tally of 94 wins puts him third on the all-time Australasian winners list behind Cane Smoke (120 wins) and Paleface Adios (108).

In 1982 and 1984 he won the Australian Harness Horse of the Year award. He was the 1982, 1983, 1984 Australasian Pacers Grand Circuit Champion and twice won the Inter Dominion Pacing Championships Grand Final.

== Stud record ==
Gammalite stood his first stud season at the Alabar Stud in 1985 at a fee of $2,000. He had sired one foal in 1979 as a two-year-old, but his first commercial crop arrived in 1986. Gammalite sired 107 individual winners, including six in 2:00. His best progeny being:

- Generator 1986 1:56.7, won $252,867
- Overlite 1991 filly, 2:02.1 $139,511, dam of Camlach (P.1:56.7 winner of $367,349).
- Serene Queen 1987 filly 2:02.5 $89,610, producer (dam of winners).

By the end of 2006, his brood mares were the dams of some 16 horses rating under 2:0.

Gammalite died on 21 December 2006 at Terang, at age 30, and he is buried at the entrance to Terang's Dalvui raceway. In 2009 he was elected to the Victorian Harness Racing Media Association Hall of Fame in its first year of operation along with his great rival Popular Alm.

== See also ==
- Harness racing in Australia
- Harness racing in New Zealand
