= Halwes =

Australian Standardbred racehorse

- Breed: Standardbred
- Sire: Nephew Hal
- Grandsire: Hal Dale
- Dam: Desmouth
- Damsire: Raider
- Sex: Stallion
- Foaled: 1959
- Died: 15 September 1987
- Country: Australia
- Color: Brown
- Breeder: H G Williams
- Owner: Charles Williams, Aub Wesley
- Trainer: Aub Wesley
- Earnings: $73,000

Major wins
- Tasmanian Pacing Championship (1966); Spring Cup (1967); Miracle Mile Pace (1968); Easter Cup (1968)

Honors
- Tasmanian Harness Racing Hall Of Fame; Australian mile record (twice)
- Last updated on 2016-01-23

Halwes was a racehorse, a Tasmanian pacer, foaled in 1959 who was notable for his win in the 1968 Miracle Mile Pace, an Australian record time trial, and his dramatic late scratching at the 1968 Inter Dominion.

== Early career ==
Halwes commenced racing at Carrick, Tasmania in November 1963 where he won by 30 yards after being backed from 5/1 to 1/2. He won three races and had a dead-heat for first before finishing second in the Novice Championship, his first defeat. He then won 8 consecutive races before finishing second to Stormy Bruce in the Tasmanian Pacing Championship. His first races on the mainland were at the Melbourne Showgrounds where he won twice in January 1965 and three times in April 1965 without defeat. He did not race again until October 1966 following the disqualification of his trainer Aub Wesley.

== 1966-67 season ==
Halwes began the 1966/67 season with a series of wins in his native Tasmania and on 31 December 1966 he won the Tasmanian Pacing Championship from a 48 yard handicap over Victorian horse Future Intangible. Returning to Victoria he was first past the post in the New Year FFA at the Melbourne Showgrounds but lost the race on protest to Robin Dundee. An injury then prevented him from starting in the A G Hunter Cup. A trip to Perth for the Inter Dominion followed where he was second to Binshaw on the first two nights of the carnival, both times as favourite and both times from a 24 yard handicap. Halwes then suffered quarter cracks in a hoof which prevented him from racing again in the series.

== 1967-68 season ==
In October 1967 Halwes raced in Sydney for the first time where he was beaten twice before winning the Spring Cup over Voice Derby then beating First Lee after giving him a 24 yard start at the handicaps. After a short break he won two more races at Harold Park before being beaten by nine yards by Raiarmagh Pool in the Summer Cup. The 1968 Inter Dominion was contested at Alexandra Park, Auckland. On the first night of the championships Halwes won by four lengths in track record time, a mile rate of 2.05 2/5 for 13 furlongs. On night two Halwes won rating 2.04 1/5 for 11 furlongs, his second track record in as many starts in Auckland. His winning margin was two lengths. Halwes then defeated another Australian pacer First Lee over two miles on the third night. On the night of the Inter Dominion final Halwes was found to have a painful abscess in a quarter crack in his off foreleg and was scratched from the final won by First Lee. Veterinary advice was that he would recover within 48 hours.

Halwes returned to Australia for the second running of the Miracle Mile Pace at Harold Park. He dominated betting starting favourite at 4/9. Halwes took control of the event mid-race from New Zealand pacer Great Adios and won by 20 yards from First Lee with a further 10 yards to Great Adios. His time for the mile was 1.58.6 which broke the track record of Robin Dundee set the previous year and the Australian mile record held by Ribands. It was also the first mile under two minutes by an Australian bred anywhere in the world

Halwes then won the Easter Cup at Harold Park from a 36 yard handicap. At Harold Park he also won an 11 ½ furlongs race in a track record mile rate of 2.02 1/5 and ran a 13 furlongs 98 yards furlong track record of 2.04 1/5 from a standing start. In 1967/68 he started 17 times for 13 wins 1 second and 2 thirds.

== 1968-69 season ==
Halwes began the 1968 season winning in Tasmania before returning to Sydney. In the Spring Cup Halwes was faced with a handicap of 48 yards and finished third behind Oligarch before beating Oligarch a week later. In a time trial on 22 November Halwes recorded a mile in 1.57.3 breaking the Australian mile record by more than one second. Halwes then suffered a minor injury and was retired following two unplaced performances at Harold Park in January 1969. In his last four years of racing his only defeated twice from level marks.

Halwes died of a heart attack, aged 28, on 15 September 1987, at the Hagley property of his owner and trainer, Aub Wesley.
