= Westburn Grant =

Australian Standardbred racehorse

- Breed: Standardbred
- Sire: Land Grant
- Grandsire: Meadow Skipper (US)
- Dam: Westburn View
- Damsire: Lumber Dream
- Sex: Stallion
- Foaled: 1985
- Died: 2020
- Country: Australia
- Color: Bay
- Owner: B & C Breen
- Trainer: Vic Frost
- Record: 67:38-11-7
- Earnings: $2,074,316

Major wins
- Victoria Derby (1989); New South Wales Derby (1989); New Zealand Derby (1989); Miracle Mile Pace (1989 & 1990); Treuer Memorial (1990); Western Australian Pacing Cup (1991 & 1992); South Australian Pacing Cup (1990 & 1992); Queensland Pacing Championship (1991); Australian Pacing Championship (1991); Inter Dominion Pacing Championship (1992)

Awards
- 3 Year Old Pacer of the Year & Australian Harness Horse of the Year (1989); New Zealand 3-Year Old Pacer of the Year (1989); Aged Pacer of the Year & Australian Harness Horse of the Year (1991 & 1992)

Honors
- Australian Pacers Grand Circuit Champion (1990, 1991 & 1992)
- Last updated on 2016-02-20

Westburn Grant (1985–2020) was an Australian champion Standardbred race horse notable for being a three time Australian Harness Horse of the Year.

Westburn Grant raced only three times at aged two in the 1987-88 season for three wins. At age three he blossomed winning the Victoria and New South Wales Derbies and finishing third in the Australian Derby. In the NSW Derby he beat Victorian pacer Rockleigh Victory by 21 metres in a track record mile rate of 1:59.0 for 2350 metres. He also travelled to New Zealand where he was unbeaten in three races including the New Zealand Derby where he outclassed the local horses winning by nearly nine lengths. He was named Australian Harness Horse of the Year for 1988-89.

As a four year old in 1989-90 Westburn Grant won the Miracle Mile Pace beating Thorate and Jodie’s Babe after an early speed battle with Thorate. He effortlessly won the Treuer Memorial at Bankstown and won the Golden Nugget against his own age in Perth however he was unplaced in the Western Australian Pacing Cup. He then won the South Australian Cup in track record time and was a close fourth in the Victoria Cup. He was placed in all three of his Inter Dominion heats at Globe Derby Park, Adelaide but was unplaced in the final. For the season he started 14 times with 8 wins and had earnings of $388,135.

In 1990-91 Westburn Grant won the Queensland Pacing Championship, the Legends at Moonee Valley rating 1.57.0 for 1940 metres and the Italian Cup at Harold Park in track record time for 2700 metres defeating Thorate before being unplaced in the Australian Pacing Championship. He then won the Miracle Mile in a track record of 1:55.6 defeating Almeta Boy and Defoe. At Gloucester Park, Perth Westburn Grant won the Western Australian Pacing Cup by 20 metres before suffering a broken pastern in a trackwork accident. He won 9 of 13 starts for the season and $606,300. Despite missing the final two grand circuit races due to injury he was still crowned Grand Circuit Champion and also awarded the honour of being named Australian Harness Horse of the Year for a second time.

Westburn Grant returned from injury with a track record win at Newcastle. He was second in the Queensland Pacing Championship when outstayed by Franco Ice in a record 1:55.1 rate for 2100 metres and won the Australian Pacing Championship at Launceston. He was third in the Miracle Mile Pace behind Christopher Vance before an emotional win in the Western Australian Pacing Cup at Gloucester Park not long after the sudden death of trainer-driver Vic Frost’s son Gary. At Moonee Valley he won the 1992 Inter Dominion from Franco Tiger and Blossom Lady. For the third consecutive year he was Australasian Grand Circuit Champion and he was voted Australian Harness Horse of the Year for a third time.

He was retired after an unplaced performance behind Jack Morris in the 1993 Inter Dominion in Brisbane. Westburn Grant died in June 2020.
