= King of Swing (horse) =

New Zealand Standardbred racehorse

King Of Swing
- Breed: Standardbred
- Sire: Rocknroll Hanover (USA)
- Grandsire: Western Ideal (USA)
- Dam: Twist And Twirl (NZ)
- Maternal grandsire: Artsplace (USA)
- Sex: Stallion
- Foaled: 13 November 2014
- Country: New Zealand
- Colour: Bay
- Breeder: Breckon Farms Limited
- Trainer: Belinda McCarthy

Major wins
- 2020, 2021 & 2022 Miracle Mile Pace; 2020 & 2022 A G Hunter Cup

Awards
- 2020, 2021 & 2022 Australian Harness Horse of the Year

King Of Swing (foaled 13 November 2014) is a New Zealand bred Standardbred racehorse that became Australasia's champion pacer.

King Of Swing was awarded the Australian Harness Horse of the Year three times (2020, 2021 and 2022). He became the first pacer to win Australasia's richest race, the $A1 million Miracle Mile Pace, three times. He also won the A G Hunter Cup twice and in total he had 11 Group 1 victories.

== Racing career ==
King Of Swing was bred by Breckon Farms Limited and originally trained by Ray Green in New Zealand. He raced 13 times for Green for 7 wins and 4 seconds, driven by David, Phillip and Zackary Butcher. In August 2017 he won two races in Australia, driven by David Butcher, including the $285,000 Woodlands Stud Breeders Crown Series Final for 2 year old colts and geldings.

In March 2018 he was exported to Australia where he was trained by Gary Hall Senior. He later moved to the stables Belinda and Luke McCarthy.

His notable performances include:

Placing	Year	Race	1st	2nd	3rd
1st	August 2017	Woodlands Stud Breeders Crown Series Final (Group 1, 2240m, Melton)	King of Swing	Poster Boy	Colt Thirty One
1st	April 2018	Western Australian Derby (Group 1, 2536m, Gloucester Park)	King of Swing	Bechers Brook	Cott Beach
1st	January 2020	Perc Hall FFA (Group 3, 1609m, Menangle)	King of Swing	Ignatius	Majordan
1st	February 2020	A G Hunter Cup (Group 1, Melton)	King of Swing	Our Uncle Sam	Chase Auckland
1st	February 2020	Allied Express Sprint (Group 1, Menangle)	King of Swing	Code Bailey	AGs White Socks
1st	March 2020	Miracle Mile Pace (Group 1, Menangle)	King of Swing	Lochinvar Art	Alta Orlando
2nd	October 2020	Victoria Cup (Group 1, 2240m, Melton)	Lochinvar Art	King of Swing	Bling It On
1st	December 2020	TAB Blacks A Fake Queensland Championship (Group 1, 2680m, Albion Park)	King of Swing	Colt Thirty One	Turn It Up
1st	February 2021	Schweppes Sprint (Group 1, 1609m, Menangle)	King of Swing	Out To Play	One Change
3rd	February 2021	A G Hunter Cup	Lochinvar Art	Alta Orlando	King of Swing
1st	March 2021	Miracle Mile Pace	King of Swing	Expensive Ego	Wolf Stride
2nd	July 2021	Garrards Sunshine Sprint (Group 1, 1660m, Albion Park)	Copy That	King of Swing	Rockin Marty
3rd	July 2021	TAB Blacks A Fake Queensland Championship	Amazing Dream	Rockin Marty	King of Swing
3rd	October 2021	Victoria Cup (Group 1, 2150m, Bendigo)	Max Delight	Triple Eight	King of Swing
1st	November 2021	Interdominion Pacing Championship heat, Menangle	King of Swing	Majestic Cruiser	Boncel Benjamin
1st	December 2021	Interdominion Pacing Championship heat, Bathurst	King of Swing	Boncel Benjamin	Max Delight
1st	December 2021	Interdominion Pacing Championship heat, Newcastle	King of Swing	Balraj	Triple Eight
5th	December 2021	Inter Dominion Pacing Championship final	Boncel Benjamin	Expensive Ego	Alta Orlando
1st	February 2022	A G Hunter Cup	King of Swing	Spirit Of St Louis	Amazing Dream
1st	February 2022	Allied Express Sprint	King of Swing	Bundoran	Jay Ok
1st	March 2022	Miracle Mile Pace	King of Swing	Spirit Of St Louis	Better Eclipse

King Of Swing retired from racing with a record of 81 starts for 43 wins and 18 placings and AUD $3,390,546 in earnings.

== Stud career ==
After retiring from the track, King Of Swing commenced stud duties at Cobbitty Equine Farm, New South Wales. His 2023/24 service fee was set at $8,800 AUD.

== See also ==
- Harness racing in New Zealand
- Harness racing in Australia
