= Mr Feelgood =

American-bred Standardbred racehorse

Mr Feelgood (foaled April 16, 2003) is a high-class Standardbred racehorse. He won major races in both North America and Australia.

Foaled in the United States, his achievements in North America included the 2006 Little Brown Jug and the 2008 Graduate FFA.

He was sold to Australian owners Kevin and Kay Seymour & Peter and Zilla O'Shea in 2008, and placed in the stable of New Zealand trainer Tim Butt.

In 2009 Mr Feelgood won the A G Hunter Cup and Inter Dominion Pacing Championship, which led to him being crowned Australian Harness Horse of the Year. After a lacklustre return by his lofty standards he moved to the stable of Luke McCarthy in Queensland following the 2010 Inter Dominion series.

He gained more Group One wins in 2010 through the Queensland Pacing Championship in track record time and the 2010 Victoria Cup when sitting in the death seat throughout.

In October 2011 he surpassed 3 million dollars in prize money when he won the 2011 edition of the Queensland Pacing Championship.

In May 2012, Mr Feelgood retired after a disappointing inter dominion campaign.

Mr Feelgood is not related to Dr. Feelgood

== See also ==
- Harness racing in Australia
