= Our Sir Vancelot =

New Zealand bred and Australian trained standardbred racehorse

- Sire: Vance Hanover
- Dam: Teeny Teeny
- Damsire: Overtrick
- Sex: Stallion
- Foaled: 11 November 1990
- Country: New Zealand
- Colour: Bay
- Breeder: VL & SV Allamby
- Trainer: Brian Hancock
- Record: 97: 48–13–13
- Earnings: A$2,197,990

Major wins
- M H Treuer Memorial (1996); Western Australian Pacing Cup (1997); Inter Dominion Final (1997); Miracle Mile Pace (1997); M H Treuer Memorial (1997); South Australia Cup (1998); Western Australian Pacing Cup (1998); Inter Dominion Final (1998); Australian Pacing Championship (1998); Inter Dominion Final (1999)

Our Sir Vancelot (11 November 1990 – February 2017) is a New Zealand-bred standardbred stallion who was trained in Australia and won a record three straight Inter Dominion finals, 1997, 1998 and 1999. This is a record that was equalled in 2008 by Blacks A Fake. He was known as Sir Vancelot in New Zealand. He was inducted into the Inter Dominion Hall of Fame.

In addition to the three Inter Dominions, he also won the 1997 Miracle Mile Pace.

Over his career, he won 48 races, from 97 starts, for a total prize money earnings of $2,197,990.

After retiring from the racetrack he stood at Warwick Stud, in Victoria for A$2,200.

In February 2017 Our Sir Vancelot died at the Allamby family home at the age of 26.
