= Popular Alm =

Australian Standardbred racehorse

- Breed: Standardbred
- Sire: Sovereign Adios
- Grandsire: Golden Adios
- Dam: Direct Design
- Maternal grandsire: Truant Hanover
- Sex: Stallion
- Foaled: 1 September 1976
- Died: 2000 (aged 23–24)
- Country: Australia
- Colour: Bay
- Breeder: Arthur Pearce
- Owner: Don Carrazza, John Green, Ken Grivec, Morris Kasses, Greg Pardo, Jack Taggart and Patricia Taggart
- Trainer: Bob Knight

Record
- 62: 49-7-3

Earnings
- A$710,883

Major wins
- Winfield Cup (1982 & 1983); Miracle Mile Pace (1983); A G Hunter Cup (1983); Australian Pacing Championship (1983); Craven Filter Sprint (1983); Spring Cup (1982)

Awards
- 1982/3 Aged Pacer of the Year & Australian Harness Horse of the Year

Honours
- World record, 1:53.2f Australasian Mile Record; Australian Mile Record (twice); Popular Alm Free For All; Victorian Harness Racing Media Association Hall of Fame
- Last updated on: 29 July 2011.

Popular Alm (1976–2000) was an Australian bred Standardbred pacer. He was one of the fastest pacers Australia has produced, running exceptional times over many distances. Popular Alm set a world record for a mile time trial at Moonee Valley on 13 May 1983, running 1:53.2. He raced 62 times over seven seasons for 49 wins, seven seconds and three thirds for stake earnings of $710,883. He was known as "Poppy".

He was bred by Arthur Pearce and foaled in 1976 at Bendigo, Victoria. Popular Alm was by Sovereign Adios from Direct Design, a daughter of Truant Hanover. He was inbred to Adios in the third generation (3x3) of his pedigree.

== Early life ==
Making his racing debut as a two-year-old Popular Alm had raced only five times before being sold for $40,000 to clients of Kilmore-based trainer Bob Knight. Making his debut for Knight in the 1980 South Australian Pacing Derby at Globe Derby Park, Popular Alm was the subject of a betting plunge. He was backed from 33/1 to 9/4 but finished second behind fellow Victorian Gammalite.

Poppy was driven by Bob Knight's son Vincent (Vin, Vinny) John Knight who died in April 1991.

After suffering an injury upon returning to Victoria he was sent for a spell and did not race again until August 1980. Progressing quickly through his classes Popular Alm won 15 consecutive races including the 1981 Kilmore Cup and a track and Australian record breaking win in 1:55.9 over the mile at Harold Park in Sydney in the Golden Mile. It was the fastest mile ever recorded in Australia to that time. The winning sequence came to an end when he finished second in the 1982 Ballarat Cup off a 25 metre handicap. After an unsuccessful Inter Dominion campaign in Perth when he finished third in the final, Popular Alm was given a spell before beginning the 1982/83 season which saw him become Australian Harness Horse of the Year.

== 1982/83 season ==
During 1982/83 he won his second Kilmore Cup from a 35m handicap and the Winfield Cup (later known as the Victoria Cup) at Moonee Valley in October. He then equalled his 1.55.9 track record at Harold Park from the previous year and won three other features in Sydney including the Bankstown Cup and Harold Park Spring Cup where he started at odds of 1/14.

In January he won the Ballarat Cup before returning to Sydney for the Miracle Mile Pace on February 4. In the Miracle Mile at Harold Park where he was previously unbeaten in four starts he won in 1.57.7 after he raced outside Gammalite for the last lap. Later in the month he won the A G Hunter Cup reducing the track record of 2.01.7 by Pure Steel to 1.59.4. No pacer had ever recorded a mile rate of better than two minutes for such a long distance.

Travelling to Auckland for the 1983 Inter Dominion Popular Alm won a heat but found the clockwise track difficult and in the final ran off on the final corner and finished second behind Gammalite in the final. Returning to Melbourne he won the Marathon at Moonee Valley before sweeping all three legs of the Tasman Challenge series where his rivals included Gammalite and the New Zealand pacers Delightful Lady and Hands Down. The series win earned him the unofficial Horse of the Hemisphere title and his career earnings passed $500,000, the only previous horses to have reached the milestone in Australian harness racing being Gammalite, Koala King, Pure Steel and Paleface Adios.

In May he time trialled at Moonee Valley and by running quarters of 27.1, 27.9, 28.6 and 29.6 he ran in mile 1.53.2. It was the fastest mile in Australia or New Zealand and by an Australian or New Zealand bred pacer anywhere in the world. Popular Alm also broke the world record held by Storm Damage for the fastest mile on a five eighths mile (1000m) track. By breaking the previous Australian mile record by 1.7 seconds, he reduced the record by more than any horse since Walla Walla in 1933. For the season he raced 22 times for 18 wins 1 second and 1 third and was named Australian Harness Horse of the Year.

== 1983/84 season ==
Early in the 1983/4 season Popular Alm won the Craven Filter Sprint (now known as the Queensland Pacing Championship) on the opening night of the new Albion Park track in 1:55.8. He won six consecutive races at Albion Park including setting a new Australian record time for a race mile of 1.54.5. A win in the Australian Pacing Championship was also part of the winning sequence. On 29 October 1983, Popular Alm became the shortest priced favourite in Australian harness racing history when winning at Brisbane’s Albion Park. In Melbourne he won the Winfield Cup for the second time beating Gammalite by 14 metres before suffering a serious injury. 'Poppy' as he had become known, had broken a bone in his leg during trackwork and did not race for nearly a year. During his recovery he received get well cards from children.

Popular Alm was able to return to racing in preparation for Melbourne's 1985 Inter Dominion Championships. Although winning his only two starts after returning to racing late in 1984 he never regained full fitness and was retired to stud.

In 2009 he was elected to the Victorian Harness Racing Media Association Hall of Fame in its first year of operation.

== Stud record ==
His notable progeny includes:

- Brief Judgement 1989 colt, 1:57.2, earnings of $62,076
- Popular Truss 1994 colt, 1:57.8 earnings of $53,576
- Southern Sugar 1987 filly, 1:58.9 earnings of $87,625

Popular Alm died aged 24 in South Australia after suffering the effects of a crippling spinal disease caused by a spur-like calcification on a vertebra in his neck.

He has had a race, the Popular Alm Free For All, named after him since the 1996/7 season. This race has been an important lead-up to the Victoria Cup one of Victoria's premier harness races.
