= Hunter Cup =

Annual harness horse race in Australia

The Hunter Cup, also known as the A.G. Hunter Cup, is a Group 1 harness horse race for standardbreds or pacers held at Melton Entertainment Park in Melbourne, Victoria, Australia.

The race was named after Alex G Hunter, the Trotting Control Board’s first chairman who was inducted into the Victorian Harness Racing Hall Of Fame in 2011. The inaugural race was held for a stake of two thousand pounds ($4000) in 1949 with Silver Peak winning, driven by Frank Culvert.

The race used to be staged at Moonee Valley before moving in 2011 to Victoria's new home of harness racing at Melton Entertainment Park.

The race distance has changed many times over its history. Since 2017 it has been raced over 2,760 metres but prior to that it was run over a longer distance (2840m to 3280m) for many years. From 1986 to 1991 it was a 2380m event. It is currently contested from a mobile start but was a standing start event from 1993 until 2016.

== Race results ==
The following are winners of the A G Hunter Cup.

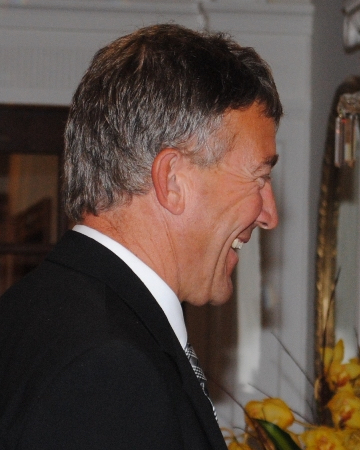
1997 winning driver, Tony Herlihy

Year	Distance	Winner	Trainer	Driver	Mile Rate	2nd	3rd
2026	2760m	Swayzee	Jason Grimson	Cameron Hart	1:53.3	Leap To Fame	Republican Party (NZ)
2025	2760m	Swayzee	Jason Grimson	Cameron Hart	1:51.9	Leap To Fame	Republican Party (NZ)
2024	2760m	Leap To Fame	Grant Dixon	Grant Dixon	1:54.0	Don't Stop Dreaming (NZ)	Max Delight
2023	2760m	Honolua Bay	Emma Stewart	David Moran	1:55.2	I Cast No Shadow (NZ)	Old Town Road (NZ)
2022	2760m	King Of Swing (NZ)	Belinda McCarthy	Luke McCarthy	1:56.7	Spirit of St Lewis (NZ)	Amazing Dream (NZ)
2021	2760m	Lochinvar Art	David Moran	David Moran	1:54.8	Alta Orlando (NZ)	King of Swing (NZ)
2020	2760m	King Of Swing (NZ)	Craig Cross	Gary E Hall Jnr	1:55.4	Our Uncle Sam	Chase Auckland (NZ)
2019	2760m	Tiger Tara (NZ)	Kevin Pizzuto	Todd McCarthy	1:53.2	Our Uncle Sam	San Carlo
2018	2760m	Lazarus (NZ)	Mark Purdon	Mark Purdon	1:54.1	Soho Tribeca	Heaven Rocks
2017	3280m	Bling It On	John McCarthy	Luke McCarthy	1:55.1	Yayas Hot Spot (NZ)	Lennytheshark
2016	3280m	Smolda	Mark Purdon	Mark Purdon	1:57.3	Ohoka Punter (NZ)	My Hard Copy (NZ)
2015	3280m	Arden Rooney (NZ)	Kerryn Manning	Kerryn Manning	1:58.4	Franco Ledger (NZ)	Easy on the Eye (NZ)
2014	3280m	Christen Me (NZ)	Cran Dalgety	Dexter Dunn	1:59.2	Caribbean Blaster	Gold Ace (NZ)
2013	3280m	Mah Sish (NZ)	Tim Butt	Anthony Butt	1:59.2	Jaccka Clive (NZ)	Caribbean Blaster
2012	3280m	Choise Achiever (NZ)	Tim Butt	Anthony Butt	1:59.9	Auckland Reactor (NZ)	Jaccka Clive (NZ)
2011	3280m	Stunnin Cullen (NZ)	Tim Butt	Anthony Butt	2:01.1	Smiling Shard (NZ)	Im Themightyquinn (NZ)
2010	3065m	Bondy (NZ)	David Butt	David Butt	2:01.7	Karloo Mick	Im Themightyquinn (NZ)
2009	3065m	Mr Feelgood (USA)	Tim Butt	Anthony Butt	1:59.3	I Am Sam	Report for Duty (NZ)
2008	3065m	Blacks A Fake	Natalie Rasmussen	Natalie Rasmussen	1:58.9	Smoken Up (NZ)	Report for Duty (NZ)
2007	3065m	Sting Lika Bee	Brian Tuddenham	Chris Alford	2:00.6	Toe Taper	Flashing Red
2006	3050m	About To Rock	Andy Gath	Kate Thompson (now Gath)	2:03.0		
2005	3050m	Elsu (NZ)	Geoff Small	David Butcher	2:01.9		
2004	3050m	Mister D G	Tim Butt	Anthony Butt	2:03.5		
2003	3050m	Mont Denver Gold	Barry W Alford	Chris Alford	2:02.6		
2002	3050m	Safe and Sound	John D Justice	Lance J Justice	2:01.9		
2001	3050m	Another Party	M B Reed	M B Reed	2:01.4		
2000	3020m	Yulestar	Judith Lorraine Nolan	Tony Shaw	2:01.3		
1999	3280m	Paris Affair	Peter Tonkin	Chris Alford	2:04.3		
1998	3280m	Try a Fluke	Justin Warwick	Brian Hancock	2:02.5		
1997	3280m	Surprise Package	Barry Purdon	Tony Herlihy	2:02:4*		
1996	3280m	Vics Vance		Barry Purdon	2:03.4		
1995	3280m	Blossom Lady	Derek Jones	Anthony Butt	2:00.6		
1994	3280m	Blossom Lady	Derek Jones	Anthony Butt	2:01.1		
1993	2840m	Master Musician	Robert Dunn	Robert Dunn	2:02.8		
1992	not run						
1991	2380m	Odds Torado		Stephen Dove	2:01.0		
1990	2380m	Our Brenray		Tracey L O’Sullivan	2:02.3		
1989	2380m	Victorys		Phil T Mahar	2:00.2		
1988	2380m	Sir Reilly		Vincent Knight	1:59.3		
1987	2380m	Trunkey Sting		T B Warwick	2:00.8		
1986	2380m	Village Kid	Bill Horn	Chris Lewis	1:59.4		
1985	2870m *	Preux Chevalier (WA) fr	Barry Perkins	Barry Perkins	1:58.5		
1984	2870m *	Rapid Frost (NSW) fr		M. Cunningham	2:04.0		
1983	2870m *	Popular Alm (VIC) fr	Bob Knight	Vincent Knight	1:59.4		
1982	2870m *	Gammalite (VIC) fr	Leo O'Connor	Bruce Clarke	2:05.4		
1981	2870m *	Koala King (NSW) fr	Ray Wisbey	Brian Gath	2:04.5		
1980	2870m *	Pure Steel (WA) fr	Phil Coulson	Ted Demmler	2:08.3		
1979	2900m *	Hanna's Boy (VIC) fr		H. Hocking	2:06.0		
1978	2800m *	Pure Steel (WA) fr	Phil Coulson	Ted Demmler	2:01.7		
1977	2900m *	Pure Steel (WA) fr	Phil Coulson	J. Retzlaff	2:04.6		
1976	2851m	Truant Armagh (VIC) fr	Graeme Morgan	Brian Gath	2:10.4		
1975	2851m	Royal Gaze (VIC) fr		K. Pocock	2:07.5		
1974	2851m	Monara (VIC) fr		D. V. Dove	2:07.9		
1973	14f.36y	Monara (VIC) fr		D. V. Dove	2:11.0		
1972	14f.36y	Dixie Boy (NSW) fr		J. L. Young	2:09.0		
1971	14f.36y	Son of Nancy (VIC) fr		N. Welsh	2:07.6		
1970	14f.36y	Adios Court (SA) fr		C. J. Webster	2:07.0		
1969	14f.36y	Golden Alley (TAS) fr		H. Pullen	2:07.8		
1968	14f.36y	Bon Adios (SA) fr		W. Shinn	2:08.8		
1967	14f	Waitaki Hanover (NZ) 24y		Doody Townley	2:06.6		
1966	14f	Minuteman (SA) 12y		Eric R. Hurley	2:08.8		
1965	14f	Stormy Bruce (NSW) fr		B. J. Forrester	2:08.0		
1964	14f	Minuteman (SA) fr		Eric R Hurley	2:09.2		
1963	14f	Idle Raider (NSW) fr		P. J. Ryan	2:10.0		
1962	14f	Sheffield Globe (VIC) 12y		W. Shinn	2:09.6		
1961	14f	Sheffield Globe (VIC) fr		W. Shinn	2:10.2		
1960	14f	Sibelia (NSW) 12y		M. Adams	2:07.8		
1959	14f	Pay Load (VIC) fr		W. A. Hickey	2:14.2		
1958	14f	Radian Venture (SA) 12y		F. Connor	2:12.0		
1957	12½f	Mineral Spring (NSW) 12y		M. Adams	2:09.2		
1956	12½f	Merchant (SA) 12y		W. K. Webster	2:10.0		
1955	12½f	Gentleman John (VIC) fr		E. J. Rothacker	2:09.6		
1954	12½f	Ribands (NSW) 48y		P. J. Hall	2:08.2		
1953	12½f	New Oro (VIC) fr		J. W. King	2:10.2		
1952	12½f	Floodlight (TAS) fr		D. L. Cornish	2:09.4		
1951	12½f	Avian Derby (NSW) fr		S. W. Bray	2:10.4		
1950	12½f	Amorous (VIC) 24y		A. R. Gath	2:11.6		
1949	12½f	Silver Peak (NSW) fr		Frank Culbert	2:11.0		

== See also ==
- Australian Pacing Championship
- Chariots of Fire
- Inter Dominion Pacing Championship
- Miracle Mile Pace
- New Zealand Trotting Cup
- Queensland Pacing Championship
- The Race by Sport Nation mobile pace
- Victoria Cup
- Harness racing in Australia
