= Miracle Mile Pace =

Annual harness horse race in Australia

Miracle Mile
- Class: Group I
- Location: Menangle Park Paceway, Sydney; New South Wales, Australia
- Inaugurated: 1967
- Race type: Standardbred - Flat racing
- Website: Menangle Park Paceway

Race information
- Distance: 1609m (1 mile)
- Track: 1400m oval, left-handed
- Qualification: Three-year-olds and up
- Purse: AUD $1,000,000 (2025)

The Miracle Mile is an Australian harness racing event for Standardbred pacers that was held at Harold Park Racetrack each November until 2008 when the race was switched to Menangle Park Paceway. Prize money has long been among that of Australia's leading harness races and has often included bonuses for speed.

== History ==
The race was held twice in 1986 due to a change of dates from January to November/December, and again in 1996 due to the postponement of the 1995 race caused by track redesign and construction. When the new track opened in 1996 the race distance was changed from one mile (1609m) to 1760m. The 2007 running was abandoned due to the Equine Influenza outbreak. The 2012 race was also delayed until April 2013 due to renovations.

Since 2009, the race has been run at Menangle Park, once again at the metric mile distance. The 1400m track length and improved design allowed for faster times. The first winner at the new circuit was New Zealander Monkey King in a track record time of 1:50.8. In 2010 Victorian pacer Smoken Up, who ran 2nd the previous year, won the race and broke the Australasian record in at time of 1:50.3 (Smoken Up has subsequently lowered that record to 1:48.5 in the Len Smith Mile, also at Menangle).

In 2018, My Field Marshal, trained by Tim Butt and driven by Anthony Butt set the race record of 1.46.9 and in doing so, became the Southern Hemisphere record holder and the only standardbred horse to pace a mile in less than 1.47.0.

The fastest ‘miles’ at Harold Park were 1:55.6 by Westburn Grant in 1990, 1:56.1 by Master Mood and 1:56.2 by Chokin. When the race distance became 1760 metres the fastest mile rates were 1:54.2 by Iraklis and 1:54.4 by Christian Cullen.

The Miracle Mile proved elusive to legendary reinsman Brian Hancock who trained one winner in Our Sir Vancelot but due to suspension was unable to drive the three-times Inter Dominion champion on the night of his win in 1997. As set out below there have been several dual winners of the flying mile - notably Smoken Up, Be Good Johnny, Sokyola, Holmes DG, Chokin, Westburn Grant and Village Kid. Champion drivers Lance Justice, Vic Frost and Tony Herlihy have won the race three times each. Kellie Kersley became the first female driver to win the race in 1996. The oldest horse to win the race was 12-year-old Double Agent.

The running of the 2022 Miracle Mile was forced to be delayed for a week from the 5th March to the 12th March after the track suffered damage due to a heavy downpour of rain between the Ainsworth Free For All (Group 1) and the Miracle Mile.

== Winners list ==
Year	Horse	Driver	Time	Mile rate
2026	Leap To Fame	Grant Dixon	1:49.0	1:49.0
2025	Don Hugo	Luke McCarthy	1:48.4	1:48.4
2024	Leap To Fame	Grant Dixon	1:48.3	1:48.3
2023	Catch A Wave	Kate Gath	1:48.8	1:48.8
2022	King Of Swing	Luke McCarthy	1:49.2	1:49.2
2021	King Of Swing	Luke McCarthy	1:49.2	1:49.2
2020	King Of Swing	Luke McCarthy	1:48.0	1:48.0
2019	Spankem	Mark Purdon	1:47.7	1:47.7
2018	My Field Marshal	Anthony Butt	1:46.9	1:46.9
2017	Lennytheshark	Chris Alford	1:49.2	1:49.2
2016	Have Faith In Me	Natalie Rasmussen	1:47.5	1:47.5
2015	Not run due to change in feature race schedule			
2014	Christen Me	Dexter Dunn	1:49.1	1:49.1
2013	Beautide	James Rattray	1:50.2	1:50.2
2013*	Baby Bling	Mat Rue	1:50.5	1:50.5
2012	*Run in 2013 due to renovations			
2011	Smoken Up	Lance Justice	1:51.8	1:51.8
2010	Smoken Up	Lance Justice	1:50.3	1:50.3
2009	Monkey King	Ricky May	1:50.8	1:50.8
2008	Divisive	Peter Rixon	2:06.9 (1760m)	1:56.0
2007	Not held due to Equine Influenza (E.I.)			
2006	Be Good Johnny	John McCarthy	2:05.0 (1760m)	1:54.3
2005	Be Good Johnny	John McCarthy	2:06.7 (1760m)	1:55.9
2004	Sokyola	Jody Quinlan	2:05.7 (1760m)	1:54.9
2003	Sokyola	Lance Justice	2:05.3 (1760m)	1:54.3
2002	Double Identity	Harry Martin	2:06.0 (1760m)	1:55.2
2001	Smooth Satin	Steve Turnbull	2:07.8 (1760m)	1:56.9
2000	Holmes D G	Barry Purdon	2:05.3 (1760m)	1:54.6
1999	Holmes D G	Barry Purdon	2:07.3 (1760m)	1:56.4
1998	Christian Cullen	Danny Campbell	2:05.1 (1760m)	1:54.4
1997	Our Sir Vancelot	Howard James	2:06.3 (1760m)	1:55.5
1996	Iraklis	Ricky May	2:04.9 (1760m)	1:54.2
1996*	Norms Daughter	Kellie Kersley	2:06.4 (1760m)	1:55.6
1995	*Run in 1996 due to renovations			
1994	Chokin	Tony Herlihy	1:56.2	1:56.2
1993	Chokin	Tony Herlihy	2:00.0	2:00.0
1992	Franco Tiger	Brian Gath	1:56.7	1:56.7
1991	Christopher Vance	Tony Herlihy	1:57.9	1:57.9
1990	Westburn Grant	Vic Frost	1:55.6	1:55.6
1989	Westburn Grant	Vic Frost	1:57.9	1:57.9
1988	Our Maestro	Vin Knight	1:58.1	1:58.1
1987	Village Kid	Chris Lewis	1:57.7	1:57.7
1986 (Dec)	Master Mood	Kevin Williams	1:56.1	1:56.1
1986 (Jan)	Village Kid	Chris Lewis	1:56.9	1:56.9
1985	Preux Chevalier	Barry Perkins	1:56.7	1:56.7
1984	Double Agent	Joe Ilsley	1:59.6	1:59.6
1983	Popular Alm	Vin Knight	1:57.7	1:57.7
1982	Gundary Flyer	Michael Day	1:56.9	1:56.9
1981	Friendly Footman	Kevin Newman	1:59.2	1:59.2
1980	Locarno	Robin Butt	2:00.4	2:00.4
1979	The Scotsman	Graeme Sparkes	2:00.7	2:00.7
1978	Pure Steel	Ted Demmler	2:00.4	2:00.4
1977	Royal Force	Dudley Anderson	1:59.5	1:59.5
1976	Paleface Adios	Colin Pike	1:58.4	1:58.4
1975	Young Quinn	Charlie Hunter	1:58.8	1:58.8
1974	Hondo Grattan	Tony Turnbull	1:59.0	1:59.0
1973	Reichman	Rex Hocking	1:58.4	1:58.4
1972	Bay Foyle	Charlie Parsons	2:00.6	2:00.6
1971	Mount Eden	Jack Miles	1:58.8	1:58.8
1970	Lucky Creed	Vic Frost	1:59.0	1:59.0
1969	Adaptor	Jack Hargreaves	1:59.2	1:59.2
1968	Halwes	Kevin Newman	1:58.6	1:58.6
1967	Robin Dundee	Robert Cameron	1:59.0	1:59.0

== See also ==
- A G Hunter Cup
- Australian Pacing Championship
- Inter Dominion Pacing Championship
- New Zealand Trotting Cup
- Queensland Pacing Championship
- Victoria Cup
- Harness racing in Australia
- Harness racing in New Zealand
