= Blacks A Fake =

Standardbred racehorse

- Sire: Fake Left (USA)
- Dam: Colada Hanover
- Damsire: Vanston Hanover (USA)
- Sex: Gelding
- Foaled: 7 October 2000
- Country: Australia
- Colour: Brown
- Breeder: R H Pointer Nominees P/L
- Owner: C M Rasmussen, T L Titcomb & C H Pointer
- Trainer/driver: Natalie Rasmussen
- Record: 105:72-19-5
- Fastest winning mile rate: At 2: 1:58.7; At 3: 1:58.0; Aged: 1:53.7
- Prizemoney: A$4,575,438

Group One wins
2006 2006; 2006; 2007 2008; 2008 2008 2008; 2009; 2009 2010	Inter Dominion Championships; M H Treuer Memorial; Victoria Cup; Inter Dominion Championships; A G Hunter Cup; Inter Dominion Championships; Queensland Pacing Championship; Trans-Tasman; Winter Cup; Queensland Pacing Championship; Inter Dominion Championships

Blacks A Fake is a brown Standardbred gelding that won the 2006, 2007, 2008 and 2010 Inter Dominion Championships, making him the only four-time winner of Australasia's premier harness race. He finished second, beaten by a long neck, in the 2009 Inter Dominion to Mr Feelgood (USA). His other achievements include wins in the Victoria Cup and Hunter Cup and three Australian Horse of the Year titles. He is Australasia's highest earning Standardbred, and (excluding exchange-rate considerations) was the world's highest earning pacer. He also was inducted into the Inter Dominion Hall of Fame.

Foaled on 7 October 2000, Blacks A Fake is a son of the Little Brown Jug winner and a Leading Australian Sire, Fake Left (USA), out of Colada Hanover by Vanston Hanover. Blacks A Fake was inbred to the million dollar winner Albatross in the third generation (3x3).

He was trained and driven by Natalie Rasmussen throughout his entire career. When Blacks a Fake suffered a major injury in 2003, Rasmussen nursed him back to health. Rasmussen also overcame crippling injuries in the early 2000s herself when it was thought that she would never be able to drive pacers again. She is the first woman in Australia to have trained and driven an Inter Dominion winner and the first Queenslander to win four.

== Racing record ==
Blacks A Fake began racing as a late two-year-old in August 2003. He won 10 of his 12 starts as a two- and three-year-old, culminating with a win in the Qbred Triad Final. However, a hock injury halted his career, and he was away from racing for 17 months.

=== Five-year-old season: 2005-2006 ===
Blacks A Fake returned to the track as a five-year-old in October 2005 and won his next six starts. A four-race campaign in Victoria that included a win and two seconds set him up for a tilt at the Inter Dominion series in Hobart during March and April 2006. Wins in the first and last rounds of heats in the three-round series saw him start a short-priced favourite in the Final, which was run for an Australasian record stake of $1.5 million. He gained the lead early on in the Final and claimed his first Inter Dominion title. Returning for a winter campaign in Brisbane after his Inter Dominion success, he won two out of three races, including the Winter Cup.

=== Six-year-old season: 2006-2007 ===
An injury-hampered start to Blacks A Fake's six-year-old season saw him return in October with two minor race wins, which were followed by a second in the Miracle Mile at Harold Park. Group One wins in the Treuer Memorial and the Victoria Cup preceded an attempt at a second Inter Dominion, for which the Final was held at Globe Derby Park, Adelaide in January. Fifth and second placings in the first two heats were followed by a win in the final heat, which saw Blacks A Fake start favourite in the Final for the second straight year. He won the race, becoming one of the few horses to win back-to-back Inter Dominions. His season ended with another winter campaign, which yielded four wins including a second Winter Cup. He was crowned Australian Horse of the Year for the season.

=== Seven-year-old season: 2007-2008 ===
The Equine Influenza outbreak in 2007 seriously affected the early part of Blacks A Fake’s seven-year-old season, with cancelled races, travel restrictions and the fact he caught the disease all contributing factors. He returned to racing in November with two wins and a second in Brisbane. He got to Melbourne in January and started with a win in the Moonee Valley Cup. His next race came in the Ballarat Cup. Blacks A Fake led the inside line throughout; however, Safari sat outside him and held a clear lead over Blacks A Fake for most of the race. Safari won the race. Blacks A Fake then went on to the Hunter Cup, a race in which Natalie Rasmussen was originally reluctant to start given that the horse would face a 30 metre handicap against a field of many of Australia’s best pacers. However, Blacks A Fake came around the field to narrowly gain the win in race-record time.

Blacks A Fake’s Hunter Cup win saw him head into the Inter Dominions at Moonee Valley in February and March as favourite. Changes to the format of the series meant that he only had to contest a semi-final (which he won) in order to make the Final. In front of a large crowd at Moonee Valley, he won the Final and joined Our Sir Vancelot as the only pacers to win three Inter Dominion Championships.

Blacks A Fake was again crowned Horse of the Year for the season, and was also crowned the Australasian Pacers Grand Circuit champion.

=== Eight-year-old season: 2008-2009 ===
Blacks A Fake started his eight-year-old season successfully with a Gold Coast Cup win followed by his first Group One wins in Queensland – the Queensland Pacing Championship and the Trans-Tasman. However, unplaced runs in the Miracle Mile and Victoria Cup followed, and he was spelled with a view to a fourth Inter Dominion.

The 2009 Inter Dominion series was held in March at the Gold Coast. One lead-up win set Blacks A Fake up for the series, which consisted of two rounds of heats. A win in the first heat was followed by a second in the second round. The Final was expected by many to be a match race between Blacks A Fake and star New Zealand pacer Auckland Reactor, who went into the Final with 20 wins from 22 starts. The early part of the race went to plan, with Blacks A Fake leading and Auckland Reactor sitting outside him. However, Auckland Reactor overraced badly throughout the race, and eventually choked down and finished tailed off. The failure of Auckland Reactor to settle in the parked position impacted on Blacks A Fake, and he was run down by Mr Feelgood and placed second.

Once again, Blacks A Fake campaigned over the winter in Queensland, which saw him add a third Winter Cup (which was now a Group One race) to his long list of achievements. He was the joint winner (with Mr Feelgood) of the Australasian Grand Circuit.

=== Nine-year-old season: 2009-2010 ===
Returning in September 2009, Blacks A Fake won his first six races for the season, including his second Gold Coast Cup and second Queensland Pacing Championship. A seventh in the Miracle Mile and a third in the Victoria Cup followed. These performances prompted connections to consider retiring the horse, with the possibility that age and racing had caught up with him. However, the decision was made to continue his career.

Three wins during late January and early February prepared Blacks A Fake for another tilt at the Inter Dominions, for which the Final was held at Menangle, outside of Sydney, in early March. He won his first heat of the series at Harold Park and overcame a wide draw to win his second heat at Newcastle. These performances were not enough to see him start favourite in the Final, with that honour going to New Zealand Cup and Miracle Mile winner Monkey King. In the race, Blacks A Fake sat three wide without cover for much of the last 1000m of the race, with Monkey King on his back. He ran down the leaders in the straight and held out the finish of Monkey King to record a record-breaking fourth Inter Dominion title.

Blacks A Fake returned to racing in July 2010 for another winter campaign. However, in his returning race he dropped out quickly at around the 400m mark and finished a long last. He was subsequently found to have suffered a heart fibrillation. He was immediately spelled, but the decision was made to continue racing as a ten-year-old. His performances were sufficient to earn him a third Horse of the Year crown.

=== Ten-year-old season: 2010–2011 ===
The early part of Blacks A Fake’s ten-year-old season was highlighted by a third Gold Coast Cup; however, he was overshadowed by Mr Feelgood, who defeated him three times in Brisbane including the Queensland Pacing Championship (albeit with better barrier draws). He went to Menangle in late November for a fourth attempt at the Miracle Mile, the biggest Australian race to have eluded him. From a good barrier draw, he led soon after the start, with Smoken Up outside him. The two horses led throughout the trip and finished locked together; however, Smoken Up denied Blacks A Fake his first Miracle Mile by a nose in an Australasian record time of 1:50.3. This performance saw Blacks A Fake become the world's highest earning pacer. This was followed by a second placing in the Treuer Memorial and two wins in Brisbane in December.

Blacks A Fake suffered another cardiac arrhythmia in training in early February. It was initially reported that this would rule out the Inter Dominion series in New Zealand; however, he recovered well and returned to racing quickly. A second placing and a win in Brisbane set him up for the series at Alexandra Park in Auckland. He ran fourth in his first heat and second in his second heat to become the first horse ever to qualify for six Inter Dominion Grand Finals. He ran third in the Final behind Smoken Up and Im Themightyquinn, but was later promoted to second with Smoken Up returning a positive drug test.

Blacks A Fake returned to racing at the Queensland winter carnival. Two wins and a third in minor events preceded a victory in the Sunshine Sprint and a second in the Winter Cup, which was his final career start.
