= Victoria Cup (harness race) =

Australian horse race

The Victoria Cup is the premier middle distance harness race of Australia. Conducted over 2575m, rather than the staying distance of over 3000m or the sprint distance of under 2000m, the Victoria Cup was run at the Melbourne Showgrounds up until 1975, when it was shifted to Moonee Valley. In 2009 the SEW Eurodrive Victoria Cup will be run at Harness Racing Victoria's new venue, Melton Entertainment Park at Melton. The race has been part of the Australasian Grand Circuit since 1987. Conducted in February from 1987 to 2003, the race is now conducted over two nights in December, alongside the Australasian Trotting Grand Prix.

The race record of 1.56.7 was set by Chokin (NZ) in 1994 when the race was run over 2380m. The race shifted to 2570m or 2575m due to a track upgrade. Double Identity in December 2003 held the record of a mile rate of 1.57.2 over the 2575m trip until Melpark Major's track record breaking performance of 1:55.8 in the 2008 event.

In 2026 Captains Mistress become the first mare to win the Victoria Cup.

== Winners ==
Year	Winner	Driver	Trainer	Mile rate	2nd	3rd
2026	Captains Mistress	Cameron Hart	Jason Grimson	1:52.6 (2240m)	Nyack	Our Sunset Delight
2025	Kingman	Luke McCarthy	Luke McCarthy	1:52.2 (2240m)	Hi Manameisjeff	Leap To Fame
2024	Swayzee	Cameron Hart	Jason Grimson	1:51.8 (2240m)	Curly James	Mach Dan
2023	Act Now	Jodi Quinlan	Emma Stewart	1:52.7 (2240m)	Catch A Wave	Leap To Fame
2022	Rock N Roll Doo (NZ)	M Stanley	M Stanley	1:54.0 (2240m)	Honolua Bay	Better Eclipse
2021	Max Delight	Chris Alford	David Aiken	1:53.2 (2150m)	Triple Eight	King Of Swing
2020	Lochinvar Art	David Moran	David Moran	1:51.4 (2240m)	King Of Swing	Bling It On
2019	Bling It On	Craig Cross	Luke McCarthy	1:51.5 (2240m)	Colt Thirty One	Cruz Bromac
2018	Tiger Tara	Todd McCarthy	Kevin Pizzuto	1:53.4 (2240m)	Chicago Bull	Carlas Pixel
2017(Oct)	Lennytheshark	Chris Alford	David Aiken	1:53.2 (2240m)	Ameretto	Tiger Tara
2017 (Jan)	Lazarus	Mark Purdon	Mark Purdon	1:52.5 (2240m)	Major Crocker	Bling It On
2016	Lennytheshark	Chris Alford	David Aiken	1:55.0 (2240m)	Smolda	Mossdale Conner
2015	Christen Me	Dexter Dunn	Cran Dalgety	1:55.0 (2240m)	Lennytheshark	Adore Me
2013	For A Reason	Luke McCarthy		1:53.8 (2240m)	Caribbean Blaster	Christen Me

== Previous winners ==
- 1974 - King's Mead (Standing Start)
- 1975 - King Frost (Standing Start)
- 1976 - Don't Retreat
- 1977 - Paleface Adios
- 1978 - Koala King
- 1979 - Koala King
- 1980 - Koala King
- 1981 - Frosty Imp
- 1982 - Popular Alm
- 1983 - Popular Alm
- 1984 - Preux Chevalier
- 1985 - Not Held
- 1987 (Feb) - Bag Limit
- 1988 - Bag Limit
- 1989 - Sinbad Bay
- 1990 - Sovereign Cloud
- 1991 - Sinbad Bay
- 1992 - Franco Ice (NZ)
- 1993 - Master Musician (NZ)
- 1994 - Chokin (NZ)
- 1995 - Golden Reign
- 1996 - Desperate Comment (NZ)
- 1997 - Desperate Comment (NZ)
- 1998 - Brabham (NZ)
- 1999 - Holmes D G (NZ)
- 2000 - Breeny's Fella
- 2001 - Shakamaker
- 2002 - Jofess
- 2003 (Feb) - Young Rufus (NZ)
- 2003 (Dec) - Double Identity
- 2004 - Sokyola (NZ)
- 2005 - Be Good Johnny
- 2006 - Blacks A Fake
- 2007 - Robin Hood
- 2008 - Melpark Major
- 2009 - Bettor's Strike (NZ)
- 2010 - Mr Feelgood
- 2011 - Smoken Up (NZ)
- 2012 - Caribbean Blaster

== See also ==
- Hunter Cup
- Inter Dominion Pacing Championship
- Miracle Mile Pace
- New Zealand Trotting Cup
- Queensland Pacing Championship
- The Race by Sport Nation mobile pace
- Victoria Derby (harness)
- Harness racing in Australia
- Harness racing in New Zealand
