= Captain Sandy =

New Zealand Standardbred racehorse

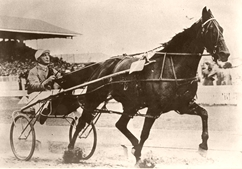
- Breed: Standardbred
- Sire: Sandydale (USA)
- Grandsire: Abbedale (USA)
- Dam: Waikura (USA)
- Maternal grandsire: Guy Parrish (USA)
- Sex: Stallion
- Foaled: 1 September 1942
- Country: New Zealand
- Colour: Bay
- Owner: J.M. (Jock) Bain (NZ)
- Trainer: J.M. Bain (NZ)

Earnings
- £43,000 ($87,424)

Major wins
- 1948, 1949 Auckland Pacing Cup; 1950, 1953 Inter Dominion Pacing Championship

Awards
- 1949 NZ Stake Earner of the Year (Pacers)

Honours
- Half mile track record of 1:59; Inter Dominion Hall of Fame
- Last updated on: 30 July 2011.

Captain Sandy was a New Zealand-bred Standardbred racehorse. He is notable in that he won two Inter Dominion Pacing Championship races and two Auckland Cups. He was inducted into the Inter Dominion Hall of Fame, being the first horse to win two grand finals of the race.

He was foaled in 1942 at Oamaru, in the South Island of New Zealand, and reared as a poddy foal, owing to an uncaring dam. Captain Sandy was by Sandydale (USA) P.2:01 ¾ from Waikaura (F1931) by Guy Parrish (USA) tracing through mares by imported sires to the ex-Australian mare Ella G (F1897) by Vancleve (USA) from Rosebud by Tempest (F1885 by Childe Harold (USA)).

== Major wins ==
He won the following major races:

- 1948 Auckland Cup
- 1949 Hannon Memorial
- 1949 Auckland Cup
- 1950 Inter Dominion
- 1953 Inter Dominion
- 1953 Easter Cup (Lord Mayor's Cup)
- 1954 Easter Cup (Lord Mayor's Cup)

Captain Sandy was also second in the 1949 New Zealand Trotting Cup behind Loyal Nurse with Lady Averil third.

He was the 1949 New Zealand Stake Earner of the Year (Pacers) earning $21,458.

Captain Sandy also set a new world record on a half mile track of 1:59, breaking Greyhound's record established in 1937. Captain Sandy amassed a total of £43,000 breaking the record of the time held by Highland Fling. He was also the highest stakes winning racehorse (either standardbred or thoroughbred) in both Australia and New Zealand until Hydrogen, a thoroughbred won a higher amount.

== See also ==
- Harness racing in Australia
- Harness racing in New Zealand
- Inter Dominion Hall of Fame
