= Inter Dominion Hall of Fame =

Harness racing recognition organization

- Established: 2005
- Location: Level 1, 400 Epson Road, Flemington VIC 3031 Australia
- Type: Hall of fame
- Website: IDHoF

The Inter Dominion Hall of Fame is an organization created to recognise and honour those whose achievements have enriched the world of the Harness racing industry, particularly in the Inter Dominion series. The hall of fame was created to honor the standardbred annual races of the Inter Dominion which includes the Inter Dominion Pacing Championship and the Inter Dominion Trotting Championship. The races are held in a rotating cycle in Australia and New Zealand. The 2020 race is being held in New South Wales.

The championship is one of the most prominent harness racing series in Australasia. Both the Inter Dominion Harness Racing Council and the Inter Dominion Events Committee participate in organizing the races. Many high calibre standardbred horses have competed in the races. The hall of fame was founded in 2005 to honor the horses, drivers, and other important participants.

== Selection criteria ==
The IDHOF inducts members based on the following criteria:

- Champion Horses :Those with at least two wins in an Inter Dominion series Grand Final.
- Top Drivers: Those with at least three wins in an Inter Dominion series Grand Final.
- Significant People: Those awarded the Inter Dominion Ern Manea Gold Medal (formerly the Inter Dominion Gold Medal) which is issued for significant long-term contribution.

== Recipients ==
=== Champion Horses ===
- Beautide
- Blacks A Fake
- Captain Sandy
- Gammalite
- Hondo Grattan
- I Can Doosit
- Im Themightyquinn
- Our Sir Vancelot
- Pride of Petite
- Scotch Notch
- Sundons Gift
- Take A Moment

=== Top Drivers ===
- Anthony Butt
- Gary Hall Jr.
- Brian Hancock
- Tony Herlihy
- Gavin Lang
- John Langdon
- Mark Purdon
- Natalie Rasmussen
- Doody Townley

=== Significant People ===
- Tony Abell
- Graeme Cochran
- Ken Dyer
- Brian Hancock
- Ern Manea
- Jack Phillips
- Dewar Robertshaw
- Bruce Skeggs

== See also ==
- Harness racing in Australia
- Harness racing in New Zealand
- Inter Dominion
