= San Simeon (horse) =

Australian Standardbred racehorse

- Breed: Standardbred
- Sire: Captain Hook
- Grandsire: Meadow Skipper
- Dam: Leyoro Lass
- Maternal grandsire: Leyoro
- Sex: Stallion
- Foaled: 1976
- Country: Australia
- Colour: Bay
- Breeder: L. Porter
- Trainer: Lou Austin

Record
- 39: 33-2-1

Earnings
- A$383,799

Major wins
- 1981 Western Australian Pacing Cup; 1981 Interdominion

Awards
- 1982/3 Australian Harness Horse of the Year; 1978/79 Australian 2yo of the Year; 1979/80 Australian 3yo of the Year; 1980/1 Australian Grand Circuit Champion

Honours
- Best mile rate, 1:59
- Last updated on: 17 August 2011.

San Simeon is a Standardbred pacer from Western Australia best known for his Australasian record winning sequence of 29 races from his first start as a two-year-old until his defeat by Michael Frost during the 1981 Interdominion series in Hobart, Tasmania. He also won three consecutive Australian Harness Horse of the Year awards.

== Racing career ==
San Simeon began his racing career on 11 November 1978 at Bunbury, 175 kilometres south of Perth. He immediately began his 29 race winning sequence by winning all 10 starts as a two-year-old including the WA Golden Slipper and WA Champagne Stakes. He was voted Australian two-year-old (2yo) of the year for 1978/9, and the $50,162 he earned that season was a new Australian record for a horse of his age.

As a three-year-old San Simeon raced only six times but recorded a win at each start. He defeated Victorian visitor Gammalite in the Western Australian Derby and then beat him comfortably in the Australian Derby. Both races were held at Gloucester Park in Perth. San Simeon was voted Australian 3yo of the year and his record now stood at 16 wins from 16 starts.

San Simeon began the 1980/1 season with a win at Harvey on 13 September. On 5 December 1980 he equalled the Australasian record winning streak of 24 wins held by Maori's Idol and Lucky Creed by winning at Fremantle. He then set a new record of 25 wins on 12 December by winning the WA 4yo Classic. San Simeon then raced against the top open class horses for the first time in the Western Australian Pacing Cup series. As a relatively inexperienced four-year-old he was well handicapped with established stars Koala King and Satinover giving him starts of 20 metres and 15m respectively. After winning both his heats he won the final on 2 January 1981 defeating King Carramar and Local Mark.

The Inter Dominion was held in Hobart for the first time and the relatively small circumference of the showgrounds circuit and handicap conditions may have contributed to the non-appearance of Satinover, Locarno, Delightful Lady and Gammalite and the poor performances by New Zealand trained horses during the series. Koala King, the previous winner, was injured. San Simeon won the slowest of three one mile heats on the first night to extend his sequence to 29 but the record went no further after he was defeated by Michael Frost on night two. "Very, very relieved" said trainer-driver Lou Austin regarding the defeat. After a third night win he was much too good for Single Again and Ardstraw in the final winning by 10 metres in track record time. Veteran Pure Steel, competing in an Interdominion for the fifth time, finished fourth after conceding the winner 15m under the handicap conditions. He was voted Australian Harness Horse of the Year for season 1980/1 and was also Australian Grand Circuit Champion.

Following the Interdominion win San Simeon was invited to take part in a World Cup series at The Meadowlands in the United States during 1982. He won two races at Gloucester Park later in 1981 before heading overseas. In America San Simeon failed to win in three starts and returned home to Western Australia. He made two further starts in 1983 without winning and was retired to stud. During his career he also won the WA 4&5yo Championship twice and the 2yo leg of the WA Triple Crown.

== Major honours ==
- 1980 Western Australian Derby
- 1980 Australian Derby
- 1981 Western Australian Pacing Cup
- 1981 Interdominion
- 1980/1 Australian Harness Horse of the Year
- 1978/79 Australian 2yo of the Year
- 1979/80 Australian 3yo of the Year

== See also ==
- Harness racing in Australia
