= Tabcorp Park =

Tabcorp Park may refer to:

- Melton Entertainment Park, Victoria
- Menangle Park Paceway, New South Wales
