= Maori's Idol =

Australian Standardbred racehorse

Maori’s Idol
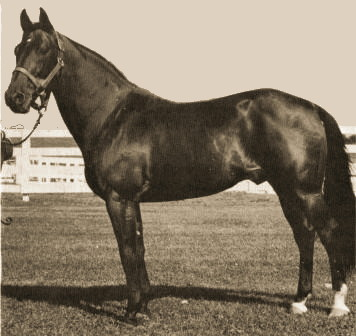
- Adios, the grandsire of Maori's Idol
- Breed: Standardbred
- Sire: Ike Frost (USA)
- Grandsire: Adios
- Dam: Maori Miss
- Damsire: Grand Monarch
- Sex: Stallion
- Foaled: 1 September 1972
- Country: Australia
- Colour: Bay
- Owner: Ric Healy
- Trainer: Ric Healy
- Record: 46: 40-3-1
- Earnings: $98,821

Major wins
- 1978 Dullard Cup

Awards
- 1977/78 Australian Harness Horse of the Year; 1977/78, 1978/79 Australian Trotter of the Year; Best winning mile rate 1:59.3, Leading Australian Trotting Sire (4 times)

Honors
- Victorian Harness Racing Media Association Hall of Fame Legend
- Last updated on 17 January 2016

Maori's Idol (1 September 1972 – 20 October 2006) was an Australian Standardbred racehorse. He was the first Australian trotter to break two minutes with a time of 1:59.3 on 19 November 1977 at Moonee Valley. Maori's Idol became one of Australia's greatest trotters, with a record 24 successive race victories before being placed third in the 1978 Melbourne Inter-Dominion Final. He is still the trotting record holder with 22 wins in a season. He was superior to his rivals. He could have gone through his career unbeaten had he been placed to advantage by his connections.

He was by a Leading Sire of Trotters, Ike Frost (by Adios) his dam was Maori Miss by Grand Monarch. Maori Miss won a heat of the 1966 Inter Dominion Trotting Championship and was selected as the Australian Broodmare of the Year in 1977, 1978 and 1979. Maori's Idol older half-brother Maori Monarch won the Victoria Trotters Derby and the Australasian Trotting Championship. Maori Miss has founded a very successful family of her own and is the third dam of Sumthingaboutmaori.

== Racing career ==
Maori's Idol was trained by his owner Ric Healy and driven by Bryan Healy at Marnoo, Victoria.

=== 1975/76 season ===
He won his first race start at Adelaide's Globe Derby Park in 1975 after being tailed off in running. He started once again that season for a win at Kilmore, Victoria before being sent for a long spell.

=== 1976/77 season ===
Maori's Idol won his first nine race starts before he was defeated from a 60-metre handicap at Bendigo against pacers. On 9 July 1977 he made a winning debut at Moonee Valley. During this season Maori's Idol had 13 race starts for 11 wins.

=== 1977/78 season ===
Maori's Idol won a race at Moonee Valley after starting with a 60 metres handicap. On 19 November 1977 he became the first trotter in Australia to break two minutes when he won the Summer Wine FFA in 1:59.3. In Adelaide Maori's Idol won three more races during the Australian Pacing Championship carnival. He also had a 50 metres victory in the Hamilton Cup against pacers. Maori's Idol had won a record 24 successive races and all of his 12 starts at Moonee Valley before finishing third in the 1978 Inter Dominion Trotting Championship final.

In Brisbane Maori's Idol won two heats of the Sir Clive Uhr Championship (now Queensland Pacing Championship) against pacers including a win over Paleface Adios. In the final he finished second to Rip Van Winkle. At the end of the season he was selected as the Australian Harness Horse of the Year, the only time that a trotter has received the award.

=== 1978/79 season ===
Maori's Idol won four of his first five starts, his only loss against pacers in the Kilmore Cup. His wins included the Dullard Cup from a 40 m handicap on 25 November and the Freestone Cup. In the Dullard Cup he broke his own track record when driven less patiently than the Inter Dominion final when there was severe criticism of the drive. He was then badly injured and didn't finish in a race at Moonee Valley on 9 December 1978. That was his only defeat in eight mobile barrier start races against trotters.

On 29 August 1981, Maori's Idol made his final start defeating New Zealand trotter Cal Brydon despite conceding a handicap of up to 40 metres to his rivals.

=== Summary ===
During his career Maori's Idol had 46 race starts for 40 wins (8 were against pacers) and four placings and then record trotting earnings of $98,821. He also won 16 of his 18 starts at Moonee Valley. Maori's Idol held Australian records at six different distances from standing starts and two for mobile starts. He holds the Australian and New Zealand record for a successive winning sequence for a trotter of 24 victories. In his career Maori's Idol won 31 of his 34 starts against trotters.

Maori's Idol was the only trotter voted in the top 10 Australian post-war Standardbreds in a poll conducted by Australian Standardbred magazine, and Harness Racing International stated that he would win the vote as Australia's best trotter in any poll when they named their greatest ever trotters.

== Stud record ==
In 1990 Bill and Margaret Hanson purchased Maori's Idol from Noel Taylor for stud duties. At stud he has sired 726 foals for 183 individual winners of $3.9 million in stakes including the Australasian Trotters Championship winner Digger's Idol. His other good performers include Alabama's Idol, Dashing Chief, Kimbo, Kwik Kiwi, Laurie's Legacy, Mighty Maori and Rainbow's Idol.

Maori's Idol died on 20 October 2006 at Homevale Stud at Fern Hill, where the 34-year-old stallion had spent his past 16 years. He was buried next to the admission gates at the Bendigo Harness Racing Club's track.

== See also ==
- Harness racing in Australia
