= Doody Townley =

New Zealand standardbred racehorse trainer and driver

David James "Doody" Townley (29 June 1925 – 28 March 1999) was a trainer and driver of Standardbred racehorses in New Zealand. He was associated with many top class horses and was a leading driver of harness horses in New Zealand.

He is notable for winning four Inter Dominion Championships, the premier trotting series of races between Australia and New Zealand. Not surprisingly, he is also an inductee in the Inter Dominion Hall of Fame. Doody also won two Auckland Trotting Cups and the New Zealand Trotting Cup. These are the two top races in New Zealand.

Townley died in Ashburton on 28 March 1999, and his ashes were buried at Ashburton Cemetery.

== Big race wins ==
Year	Race	Horse
1952	New Zealand Derby	Rupee
1959	Great Northern Derby	Sun Chief
1962	Great Northern Derby	Tactile
1963	Rowe Cup	Pohutukawa
1963	New Zealand Derby	Bellajily
1965	Dominion Handicap	Mighty Chief
1965	Inter Dominion Pacing Championship	Robin Dundee
1966	New Zealand Free For All	Waitaki Hanover
1966	Auckland Trotting Cup	Waitaki Hanover
1967	Hunter Cup	Waitaki Hanover
1968	Inter Dominion Trotting Championship	Stylish Major
1970	New Zealand Free For All	Stella Frost
1970	Auckland Trotting Cup	Stella Frost
1971	New Zealand Trotting Cup	True Averil
1971	Inter Dominion Pacing Championship	Stella Frost
1980	Inter Dominion Trotting Championship	Hano Direct

== See also ==
- Harness racing in New Zealand
