= Forbury Park Raceway =

Race track in Dunedin, New Zealand

Coordinates: 45°54′26.72″S 170°29′47.30″E

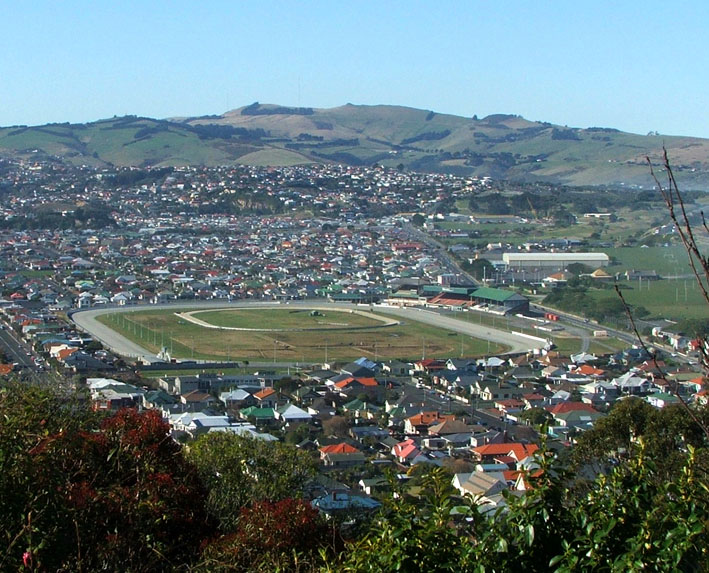
Forbury Park Raceway, viewed from above St. Clair, Dunedin.

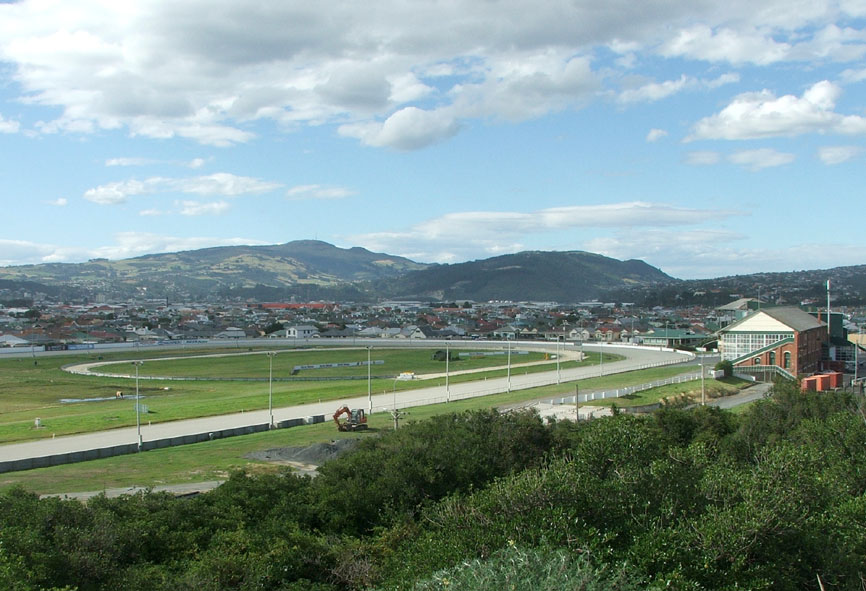
Forbury Park Raceway, looking northeast across the city.

Forbury Park Raceway was a horseracing venue in the New Zealand city of Dunedin until its closure in 2021. It was located close to the Pacific Ocean coast in the suburb of Saint Kilda.

The raceway was initially developed in 1870 on an area of reclaimed swamp, with a one-mile track leased to the Dunedin Jockey Club. The site was used for both galloping and saddle trotting events until 1898, at which time the Dunedin Jockey Club moved to a new venue at Wingatui, near Mosgiel.

Light harness racing began at Forbury in 1909, at about which time the track was reduced to approximately 1100 yards (1000 metres). The installation of floodlights in 1960 saw the advent of night trotting. The venue is currently used for both harness racing and greyhound racing, as well as for other large-scale outdoor events. It is one of the country's main trotting venues.

The Forbury Park Trotting Club marked 100 years of harness racing at Forbury Park with a race meeting on Thursday 26 November 2009, the identical date of the first meeting on the track in 1909. The club itself had been racing for 110 years at that stage as its first meeting had been at Tahuna Park in May 1892. It had held a centennial meeting in October 1992.

Forbury Park was the first club in the South Island to hold a night trotting fixture with the inaugural such meeting on Thursday, 26 January 1961.

An especially historic year for the club was 1965, when, with a new members' stand built for the occasion, it hosted the famed Inter Dominion series. This was the only Inter Dominion ever held in New Zealand outside of either Auckland or Christchurch. Robin Dundee and Jay Ar dead-heated for first place in the Inter Dominion Pacing Championship while Poupette won the Inter Dominion Trotting Championship.

Forbury Park also hosted Long Track Motorcycle Speedway, with the New Zealand Long Track Championship held there seven times from 1982 to 1988. The first four championships were won by legendary New Zealand rider Ivan Mauger.

== Closure ==
In February 2021 the Forbury Park Trotting Club announced plans to sell the racetrack and move to a new location outside the urban area.

Craig Paddon, chairman of the Forbury Park Trotting Club said the club had suffered financially when racing dates were taken away from it. He said the club previously ran 19 race days a year but all those dates were to be taken away and we fought tooth and nail to get 10 dates back. "But that was never going to be economically sustainable for the club. You can’t help but think the code has decided to shut Forbury down, get the money and spend it elsewhere, and when I say elsewhere, possibly Southland and at Addington in Christchurch.”

Forbury Park held its last race meeting on 8 July 2021.

In July 2021 it was reported that some of the sale proceeds would be given to the Forbury Park Trotting Club to continue harness racing at other venues such as the grass thoroughbred track at Wingatui and Wyndham in Southland. The balance of proceeds would go to Harness Racing New Zealand (HRNZ) in accordance with the provisions of the Racing Act. HRNZ chief executive Gary Woodham stated: "If that happens then that money will be used for the benefit of harness racing in the region, south of the Waitaki River".

== See also ==
- Harness racing in New Zealand
- Addington Raceway
- Alexandra Park, Auckland
