= Scotch Notch =

Australian Standardbred racehorse

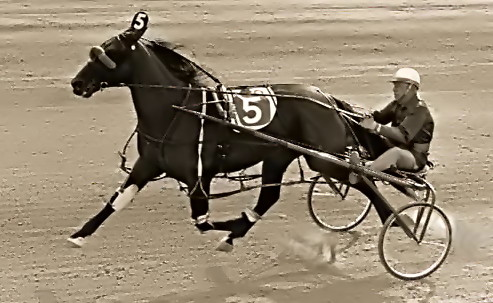
- Bret Hanover, the grandsire of Scotch Notch.
- Breed: Standardbred
- Discipline: Trotting
- Sire: Scottish Bret (USA)
- Grandsire: Bret Hanover
- Dam: Ada Glenfern
- Maternal grandsire: Tarport Kid
- Sex: Mare
- Foaled: 1977
- Country: Australia
- Color: Brown
- Breeder: L.J.K. McClure
- Owner: James Y. Wong
- Trainer: Graeme Lang; 2. Mike Gagliardi

Record
- 133: 65-30-8

Earnings
- $670,755

Major wins
- Group one wins: 1981 Vic Trotters Oaks; 1983 NZ Dominion Handicap; 1983, 1985 Inter Dominion Trotting Championship; 1985 Australasian Trot Championship

Awards
- 1983, 1985 Stake Earner of the Year (Trotters)

Other awards
- 1983 NZ Trotter of the Year; 1983, 1984, 1985 Australian Trotter of the Year

Honors
- Group 3 Scotch Notch race
- Last updated on: 24 August 2011.

Scotch Notch (1977–1990) is an Australian Standardbred mare, the current world record holder for the Trotters One Mile Time Trial set 3 September or 9 March 1985 at Moonee Valley, Victoria, Australia. She won the 1983 and 1985 Inter Dominion Trotting Championship. Scotch Notch was named "Australian Trotter of the Year" in 1983 1984 and 1985. She was inducted into the Inter Dominion Hall of Fame.

== Breeding ==
She was a brown mare that was foaled in 1977 in Victoria. Scotch Notch was sired by the pacer Scottish Bret (USA) from Ada Glenfern by Tarport Kid (USA). Scottish Bret (by world champion pacer Bret Hanover) was imported to Australia in 1973. His first foals were produced in the UK after he had stopped there on his way to Australia. Scottish Bret's winners totalled 131 pacers and 28 trotters, the fastest and most successful by far of either gait being Scotch Notch. Adios appears on both sides of Scotch Notch's pedigree making her inbred to him in the third and fourth generations (3m x 4f).

== Racing career ==
Scotch Notch's trainer and driver was Graeme Lang. She did not start as a two-year-old, but had nine starts at three years for two wins and four placings, including a win at Moonee Valley in the Victoria Trotters Oaks. At four years of age Scotch Notch had thirteen starts, for eleven wins and one placing.

=== At five years ===
As a five-year-old, Scotch Notch had eighteen starts in Australia for wins in the VL Dullard Trotters Cup and the G2 EB Cochran Trotters Cup. In New Zealand she won a heat and the final of the Group one (G1) 1983 Inter Dominion Trotting Championship by defeating Sir Castleton in Auckland. In doing so she set a world record and Inter Dominion distance record mile rate of 2:04.4ss over 2,700 metres. During her New Zealand trip Scotch Notch had four starts for three wins and a second with $49,365 in prize-money.

=== At six years ===
In the 1983/84 season Scotch Notch had six starts in Victoria with three wins and three places. In November 1983 at the New Zealand Cup meeting she had 45 metres handicap in the NZMTC Handicap where she finished second, followed by another second in a Free for All (FFA). Scotch Notch was handicapped 10 metres in the 1983 Dominion Trotting Handicap over 3,200 metres at Christchurch.

Travelling to South Australia, Scotch Notch won two heats of the 1984 Inter Dominion Trotting Championship but was defeated in the Final by Sir Castleton (NZ). Scotch Notch's earnings for this season were $72,898.

=== At seven years ===
During the 1984/85 season Scotch Notch won nine races at Moonee Valley and had several starts at Kilmore, including a start in the Group Two Kilmore Cup against the pacers when she finished seventh.

In the 1985 Inter Dominion Trotters Championship at Moonee Valley, Scotch Notch was defeated in the first heat by Sir Castleton but then won a division on the second night of heats. The Final was contested on 2 March 1985 over 3,300 metres when Scotch Notch defeated Sir Castleton by six metres to become the first trotter to win the Inter Dominion for a second time.

A week later, Scotch Notch time trialled in 1:55.6 setting not only a new world record for trotting mares, but also a new Australasian record, that still stands (now shared with Lyell Creek). She then won three of her next four starts including the Australasian Trotters Championship (from a 60-metre handicap) and her last Australian start on 13 April 1985 in the EB Cochran Cup. Scotch Notch was the Winner of 28 races at Moonee Valley and her Best Mile Rate TT 1.55.6 was at Moonee Valley.

=== In the US ===
This season's performances of Scotch Notch, brought an invitation to compete in an event that had twelve of the best trotters from USA, Canada, Europe, Scandinavia and Australia would contest. The invitation was accepted and trainer/driver Graeme Lang along owner Jim Wong and their families went to New York. Scotch Notch had a virus it was doubtful if she would be fit to race. On 17 June 17 in the first of the series Scotch Notch finished well for 6th position at the end to the Swedish competitor Meadow Road.

Meadow Road again defeated Scotch Notch in the second race over one mile when she finished fourth in the $185,000 event. Graeme Lang and Scotch Notch stayed on and competed in six races for five seconds. Scotch Notch was then left with US trainer/driver Mike Gagliardi who managed her for the rest of her American racing. Her 1985 US record was 16 race starts for 5 wins and 7 placings with earnings of $USD116,050.

On 14 February 1986 she defeated the champion mare Grades Singing in an Invitation event. Scotch Notch had her last start at Freehold Raceway on 6 November 1987, winning in 2:02.4 and was then retired. During 1986 and 1987 Scotch Notch had a total of 44 starts for 13 wins and 17 placings, winning $USD219,849.

=== Summary ===
Overall Scotch Notch's lifetime statistics and earnings were as follows:-

- Australia 66 starts: 43 wins 14 places and $249,091 in earnings
- New Zealand 7: 4 wins and 3 places and $85,765 in earnings
- US 60 starts: 18 wins, 21 places and $335,899 in earnings.

== Stud record ==
In 1988, she was covered by Speedy Crown (the world's leading sire of 2.00 trotters), and she along with her colt foal were shipped to Melbourne in 1989. The colt was named Speedy Scotch and was not raced and sent to stud. Speedy Scotch sired seventy five foals for twenty winners, the best of which was Melancholy Comment Tr.2:00.8.

Scotch Notch died in 1990 without any further foals to perpetuate her history. The ashes of Scotch Notch were laid to rest at Shepparton Harness Racing Club's Garden of Honour.

== See also ==
- Harness racing in Australia
