= Galleons Sunset =

New Zealand Standardbred racehorse

Galleons Sunset (Freezebrand: 01Z2316) is a bay Standardbred harness racing gelding from New Zealand. He was bred by the Fanny Allen Family Trust and foaled on 14 November 2001. Galleons Sunset was sired by Sundon out of Galleons Dream by Chiola Hanover. He was trained by Derek Balle and won the 2008 Interdominion trotting title for Chris Lang.

== Races ==
Galleons Sunset's first Group One race was in the 2,575 metres SEW Eurodrive Australian Trotting Grand Prix at Moonee Valley Racecourse where he finished fourth. He won his first race near the end of 2007 in the 1,609 m Bill Collins Trotters Mile with a mile rate of TR1:58.9. In early 2008, Galleons Sunset placed second in the 2710m Sky Channel Dullard Trot Cup at Ballerat Racecourse. His next win was the upset at the Interdominion Grand Finale, that year held at Moone Valley, with a mile rate of TR 2:03.3. Early in 2009, Galleons Sunset placed third in the Vue Bar Skycity Cambridge Trotters and then went on to win the Tri Cups Golf Day Handicap. In the Dawn Balle Memorial Handicap, Galleons Sunset unexpectedly won the trot dedicated to the memory of his trainer's mother.

On 24 December 2009, Galleons Sunset was retired from racing after his final start due to a chronic fetlock injury. He was retired at his trainer Derek Balle's father's farm.
