= Harness racing in Australia =

Australian sport

Harness racing, also colloquially known as trotting or the trots, is a spectator sport in Australia, with significant amounts of money wagered annually with bookmakers and the Totalisator Agency Board (TAB). In Australia there are 90 harness racing tracks, which hold over 1,900 meetings annually. There are approximately 2,900 drivers and 4,000 trainers with about 5,000 Standardbred horses foaled and registered each year.

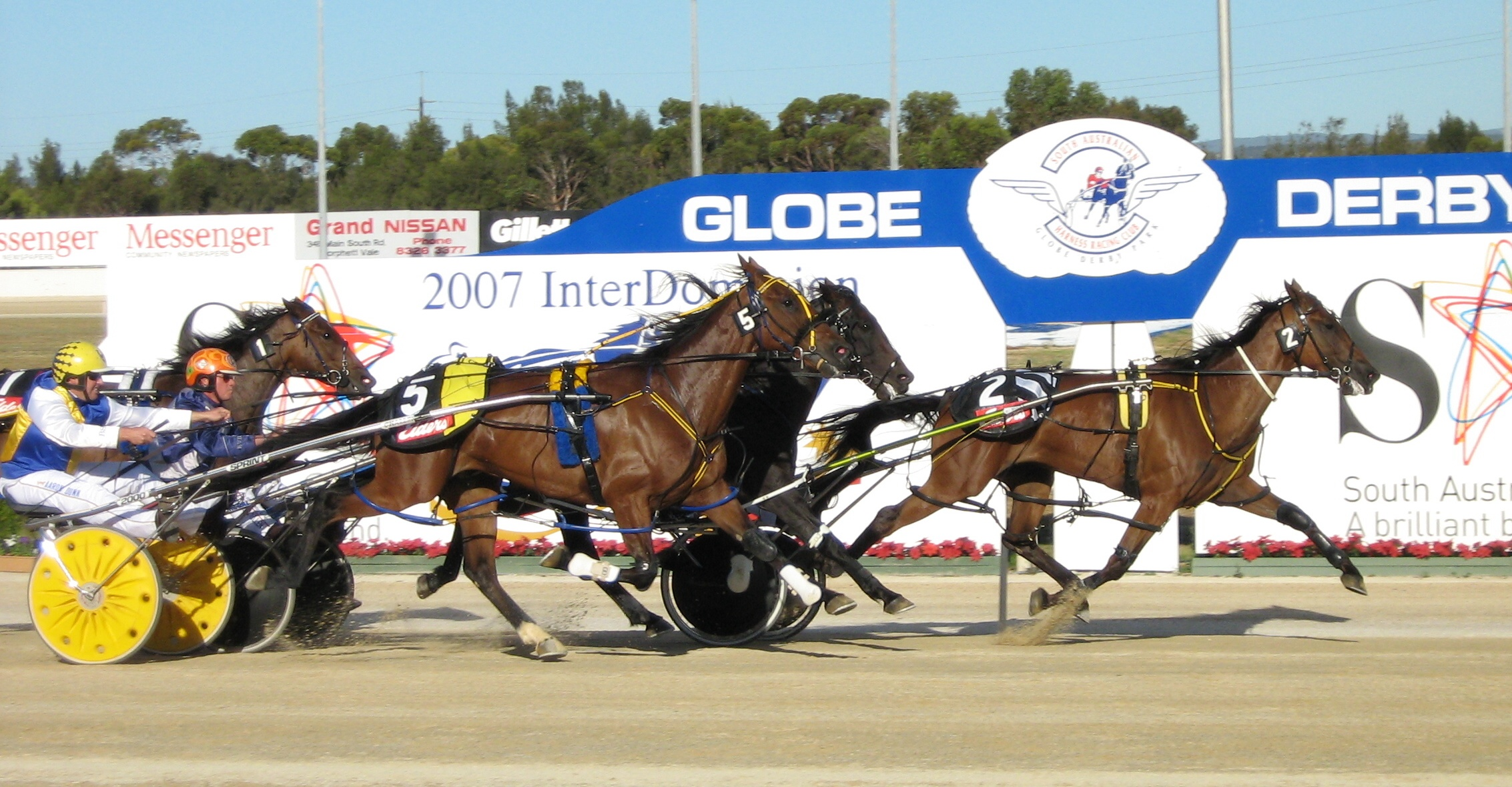
Harness Racing at the 2007 Inter Dominion Championships held at Globe Derby Park in South Australia in January 2007

== Racing ==
Harness racing in Australia is conducted with Standardbred horses racing around a track while pulling a driver in a two-wheeled cart called a "sulky", "gig" or "bike". Standardbred racehorses compete in two gaits, pacing and trotting, and trotters may enter pacing events, but not vice versa. Pacers contest 80% to 90% of Australian harness races. Races are conducted in an anti-clockwise direction generally over distances from 1,609 metres (1 mile) to 2,650 metres, although some races such as the A G Hunter Cup are run over longer distances. Harness racing tracks typically measure from 700 to 1,000 metres.

Racing is administered by Harness Racing Australia (HRA) (formerly known as the Australian Harness Racing Council), with each State's Principal Racing Authority agreeing to abide by, and to enforce the rules and regulations.

Race meetings are often conducted at night, with many major metropolitan meetings held on Friday and Saturday nights. Standardbred racing in Australia differs slightly from American racing, in that it uses the metric system to measure distances and there are often more starters in a race.

Races are started in one of two ways, either from behind a mobile barrier, using a mobile start or behind tapes from a standing start. The mobile barrier is usually a car or ute with two long arms, behind which the horses line up before moving to the starting line. The barrier may cover the entire track and in some cases the mobile can be ten horses wide. When the wings of the gate swing back, the starting vehicle speeds off, thus releasing the horses. This is the most common method of starting pacers and trotters in Australia.

The Australian International Design Awards winning AVA Integrity Mobile starting gates are used in Australia and include auto start. This innovation allows the starter to concentrate on the horses and contributes to integrity and fairness during the "score up". The modern starting gates use only a driver for steering the vehicle and a starter in the rear to observe the race and call a false start if required.

A standing start is made where horses stand flat footed behind an elastic tape that is connected across the track. Usually there are multiple tapes across the track at 10 or 5 metre intervals; this allows handicappers to handicap horses. This may be done on wins in certain classes or on a discretionary basis. Both pacers and trotters races are conducted from standing starts.

== Major races ==
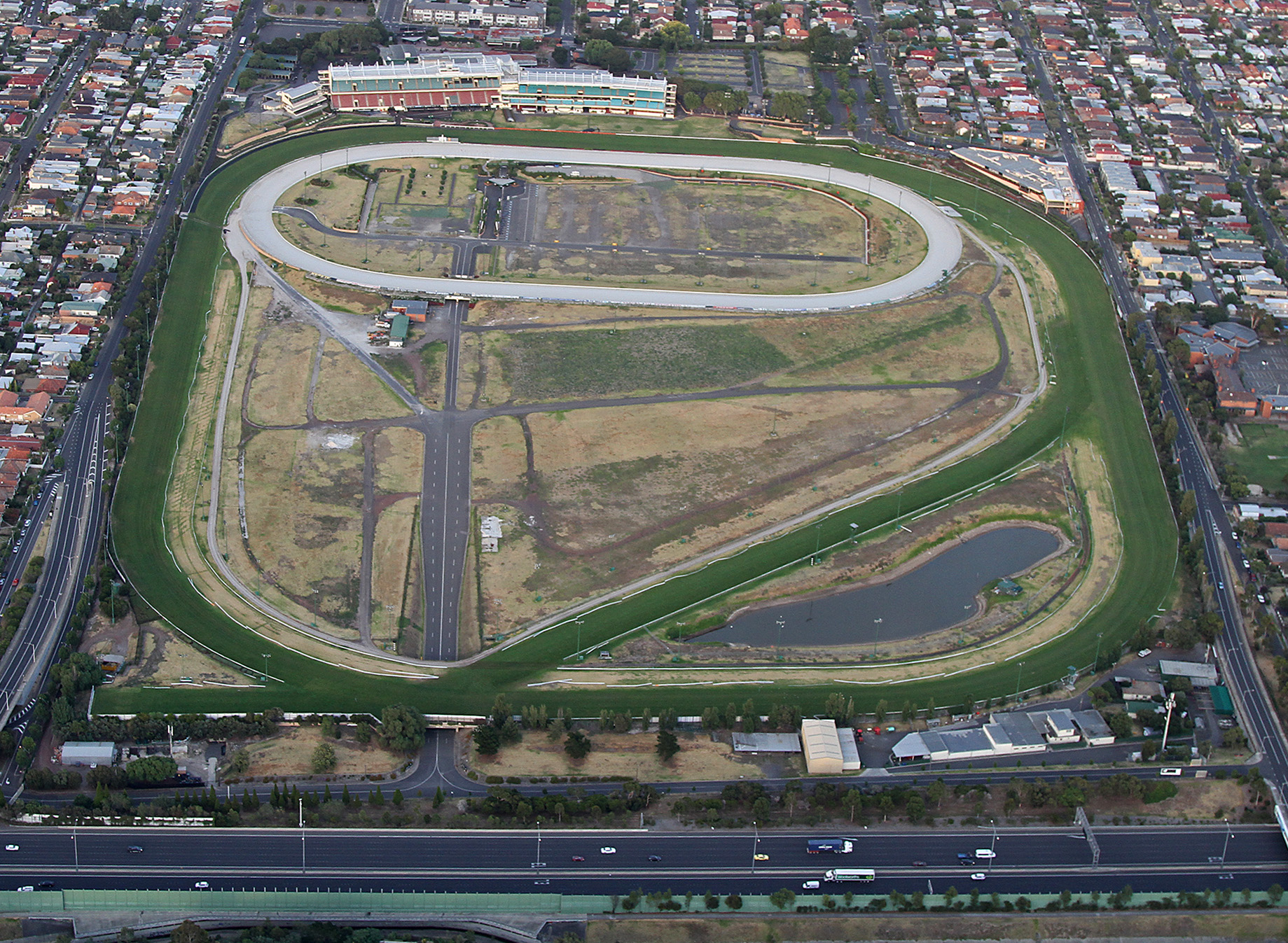
Aerial view of Moonee Valley Racecourse, showing the light coloured harness racing track

The Inter Dominion is a major harness racing competition conducted between horses from Australia and New Zealand. This series has been contested since 1936 and comprises the Inter Dominion Pacing Championship and the Inter Dominion Trotting Championship.

The Australian Pacers Grand Circuit is a series of Group One events that was designed to be the showpiece of the Australian harness racing Industry. It includes the A G Hunter Cup, Miracle Mile Pace, Blacks A Fake Queensland Championship, Victoria Cup.

The premier juvenile harness racing series in the Southern Hemisphere is the Australasian Breeders Crown for the best two-, three- and four-year-old trotters and pacers from Australia and New Zealand. Other leading three-year-old events include the New South Wales Derby, Victoria Derby, West Australian Derby and Queensland Derby.

An independent company Australian Pacing Gold Limited (APG), owned by the three principal clubs, is responsible for the three major eastern states’ harness tracks:

- NSW Harness Racing Club (Menangle Park Paceway),
- Albion Park Harness Racing Club (Albion Park, Brisbane), and
- Harness Racing Victoria (Melton Entertainment Park).

APG conducts the premier yearling sales in the three eastern states and manages a sales linked futurity race series for two-year-old and three-year-old pacers that were foaled in eastern Australia and sold at APG sales.

== History ==
=== Early meetings and clubs ===
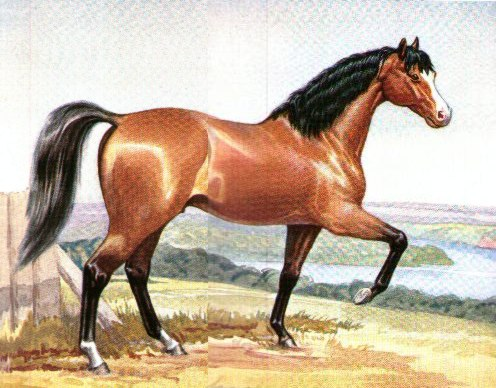
An early importation to Australia was the Arabian stallion (Old) Hector, who sired some early Australian Standardbred and Thoroughbred racehorses.

Trotting races commenced on 30 April 1810 at Parramatta, New South Wales, when the first event was held during a sports carnival and was won by Miss Kitty by the imported (Old) Hector, an Arabian stallion that was used for breeding Thoroughbreds.

In 1834 Western Australia held its first trotting race at Fremantle and in 1844 Tasmania recorded its first trotting event at Launceston.

The first organised race meeting for trotters and pacers in Australia was held 21 January 1860 on the racecourse at Flemington, Victoria. The feature event was the Harness Race, which had a purse of 100 sovereigns. Trotting under saddle was another event which held that day and it had a purse of 50 sovereigns.

The Ballarat and Creswick Trotting Club was established in 1861 becoming Australia's first club formed specifically to promote Harness Racing.

In 1882 Australia's first harness racing track was constructed at Elsternwick Park (Melbourne). The same year Queensland's first trotting race was arranged by the Brisbane Driving Park Club and held at Eagle Farm. Tasmania's first all-trotting meeting was held at Newtown in 1884.

A meeting was conducted under electric lights on 6 February 1890 at what is now Harold Park Paceway. Further introductions of night trotting on floodlit tracks led to an increase in attendances and the development of a major racing industry.

In 1902 the New South Wales Trotting Club was established to formalise harness racing after the Government had banned unregistered racing. On 19 November 1902, the inaugural meeting was held on the Forest Lodge course as it was then known, later known as Epping until 21 March 1929, and then afterwards known as Harold Park.

The rapid rise of Trotting in South Australia with legalised betting in 1934 was beyond the wildest of dreams with huge attendances and South Australia became the Commonwealths most important trotting State. In fact S.A Trotting then gave a lot of money to charity as exemplified by giving the Government seven thousand pounds over a short period of time to help replace the ill-fated HMAS Sydney. In front of Saturday Afternoon crowds of over 25,000 spectators one of the most successful South Australian trainer/reinsmen during this halcyon period was Brooklyn Park horseman Malcolm Allan. Malcolm's wife Mary Allan (McGowan) was also a pioneer female rider in harness racing in the 1920s, winning 16 trophies in 16 races (see Brooklyn Park for further information on Malcolm and Mary Allan).

A mobile barrier was first used at Harold Park, New South Wales track on 2 November 1956 in a mile race won by Mineral Spring in 2:01.2. However the barrier was deemed unsafe after two races and it took a further 9 years before further attempts were made. The prototype hydraulically operated mobile barrier was introduced into NSW in 1963 by William (Bill) George Smith, a Sydney motor body builder who had a passion for harness racing and wanted to make it more exciting for the public and punters. On 14 October 1970 in an article on the success of the Miracle Mile the Sydney Morning Herald reflected on the introduction of new barrier in 1965. The article stated that after months of testing the barrier at Sunday gymkhanas, shows and trials during 1964 and 65 it was then decided to introduce the barrier at Harold Park. Harold Park trialled and approved the use of the Smith designed barrier on 21 May 1965. 'Late in 1966 The New South Wales Trotting club Ltd and H O & W D Wills promoted a new feature race call the Craven Filter Miracle Mile'. the idea was to break the two minute mile and for Australian horses to gain worldwide recognition. The first Miracle Mile was held at Harold Park in 1967 and the New Zealand mare Robyn Dundee won by breaking the two minute barrier at 1:59.

On 7 July 1975 in Queensland, Junior Harness Racing was founded by a group of breeders to give young people, aged between 6 and 16, an opportunity to obtain a practical introduction to the Harness Racing Industry. The children have the opportunity to drive Shetland ponies in harness under race conditions. No prizemoney is payable on pony races, however winners and place getters receive medallions.

=== Horses ===
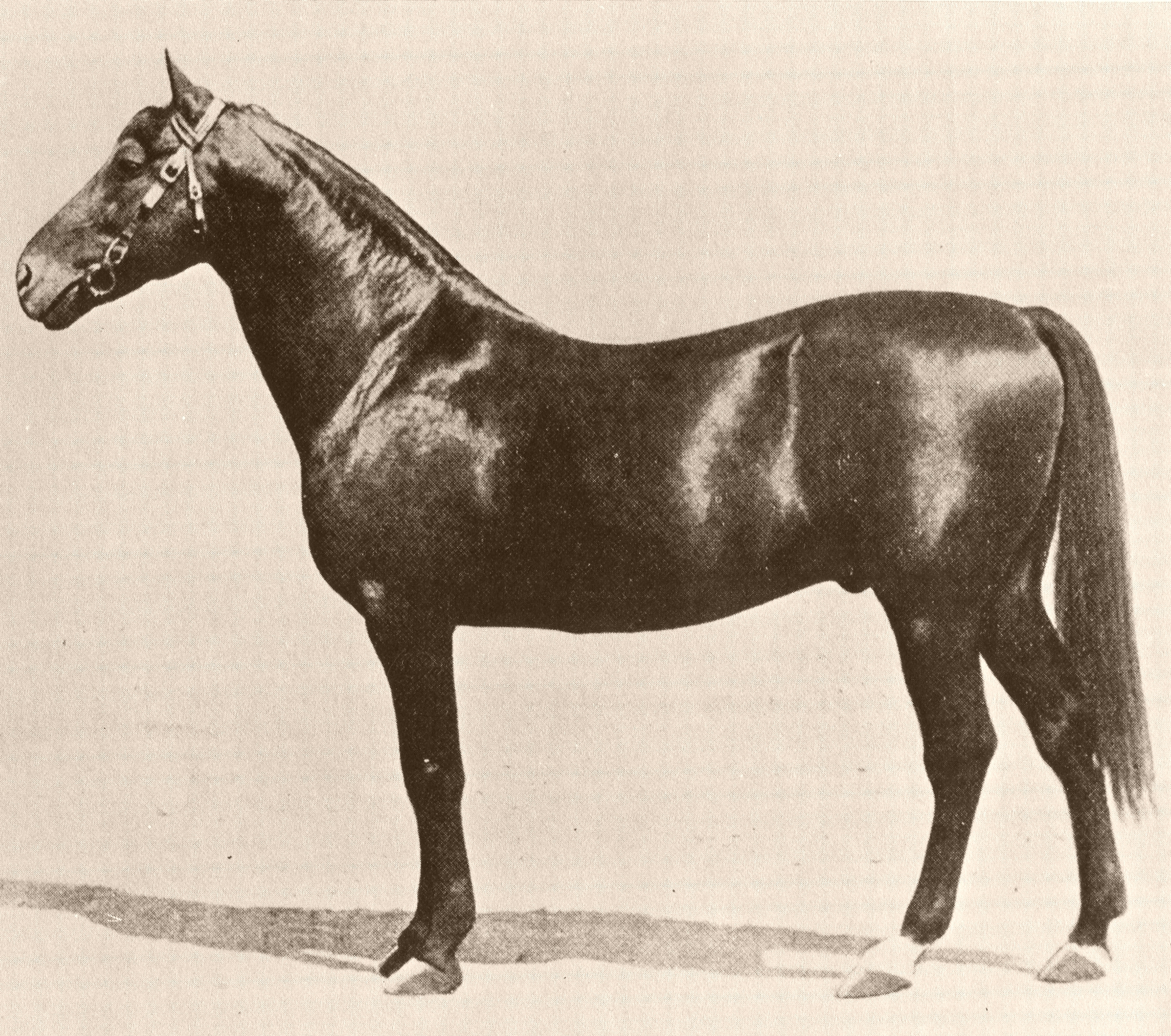
Childe Harold (US)

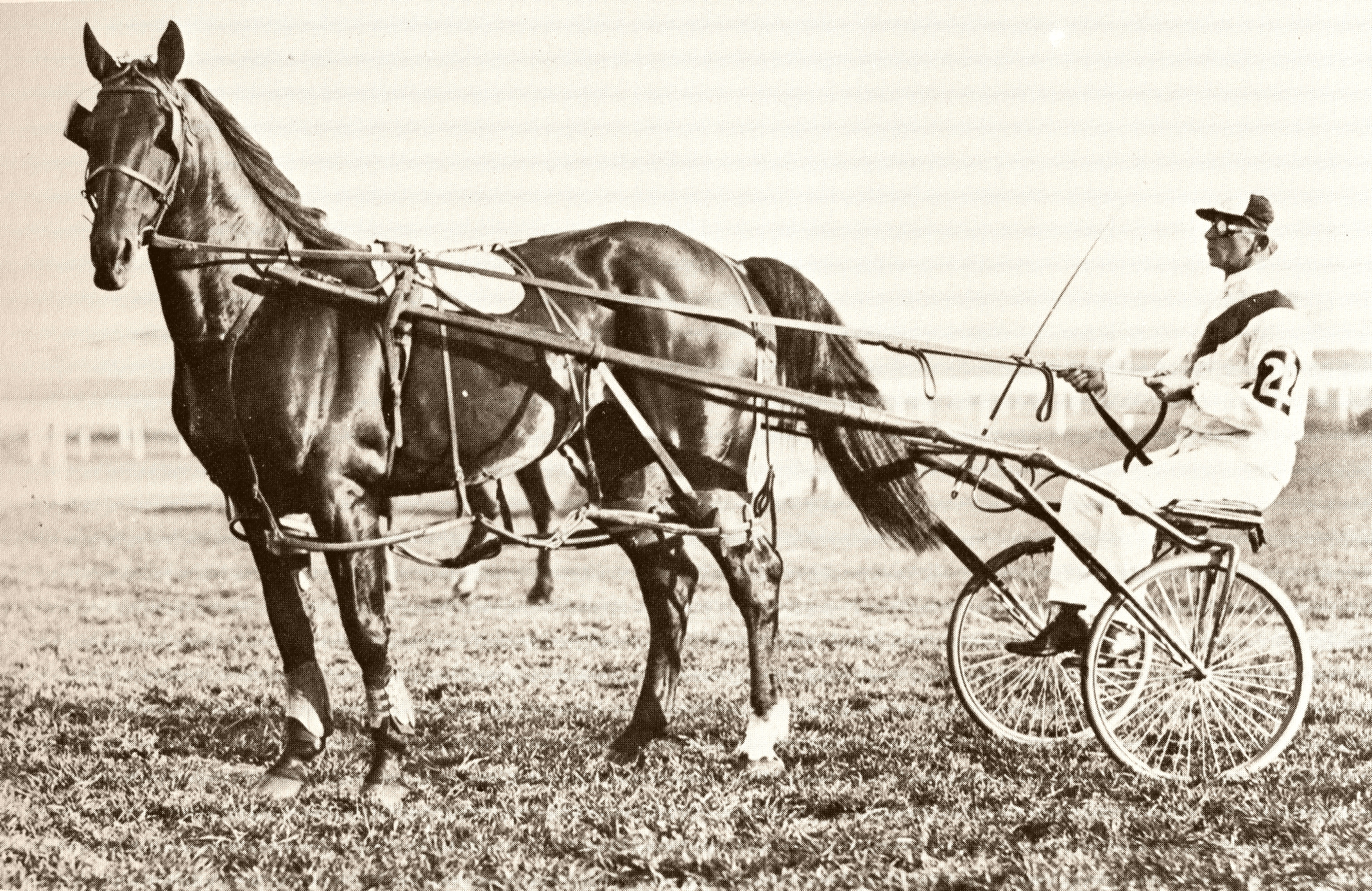
Globe Derby at a race meeting.

Harness racing became a popular sport as few people could afford the expense of a hack, let alone a Thoroughbred racehorse, whereas most families had a horse which could be driven as well as ridden. Initially trotting events were scheduled for Trotting under saddle and Hack trots. Various allowances were made for horses measuring under 15 hands 1 inch, too. In 1893 hopples were used for the first time in a race at a Kensington, New South Wales meeting on the imported gelding, Plain Bill. Early in the twentieth century races for trotters drawing light carts or high two-wheeled sulkies were introduced and later specially designed light, smaller wheeled gigs were used.

Sir William Don an inbred Thoroughbred gelding bred by Mr. Mackenzie in 1856 near the Murrumbidgee River became the 13th fastest pacer in the harness racing world. He was by Mozart (GB) from a mare by te same Mozart. This gelding was able to maintain a good speed while racing free-legged, i.e. unhoppled, and was the best Australian bred harness horse up until the 1870s.

Vancleve (USA) was imported to Australia in 1882 and held the Australian mile record for trotters. He later sired the immortal Fritz, an all time trotting champion. Fritz, was foaled in 1890 and broke the previous Australian Standardbred time record by more than 10 seconds for the mile. Vancleve's progeny won him leading sire titles in Australia and New Zealand, although he did not stand at stud in New Zealand.

Andrew Town of Richmond, New South Wales, imported the Kentucky bred, Childe Harold (by Harold) in 1882 for £3,935. Childe Harold had won in 1874 the International Trot at Liverpool, England. In 1879, he won an important race in France, and he was then taken on a tour of the Continent. In that year, he won races in Ireland, Scotland, France, Germany and also in Russia, where he won two big trotting events. This stallion produced superior quality trotters and 45 of his sons became sires. Childe Harold's name can still be found in some of today's Standardbred pedigrees. Harold Park was named in honour of Childe Harold.

Globe Derby, foaled 1910 in Australia, was the champion pacer of his day and then went on to become a Leading Australian Sire for twelve successive seasons and still has present day descendants racing.

In 1934 Springfield Globe by Globe Derby was foaled in Tasmania and later won the Inter Dominion. Springfield Globe was an outstanding sire that produced 229 winners. Dual-gaited U Scott (USA) was exported to New Zealand in 1935 as a two-year-old, where he became the outstanding sire of 410 winners of $2,315,503 and his name features prominently in the bloodlines of many of Australasia's greatest horses.

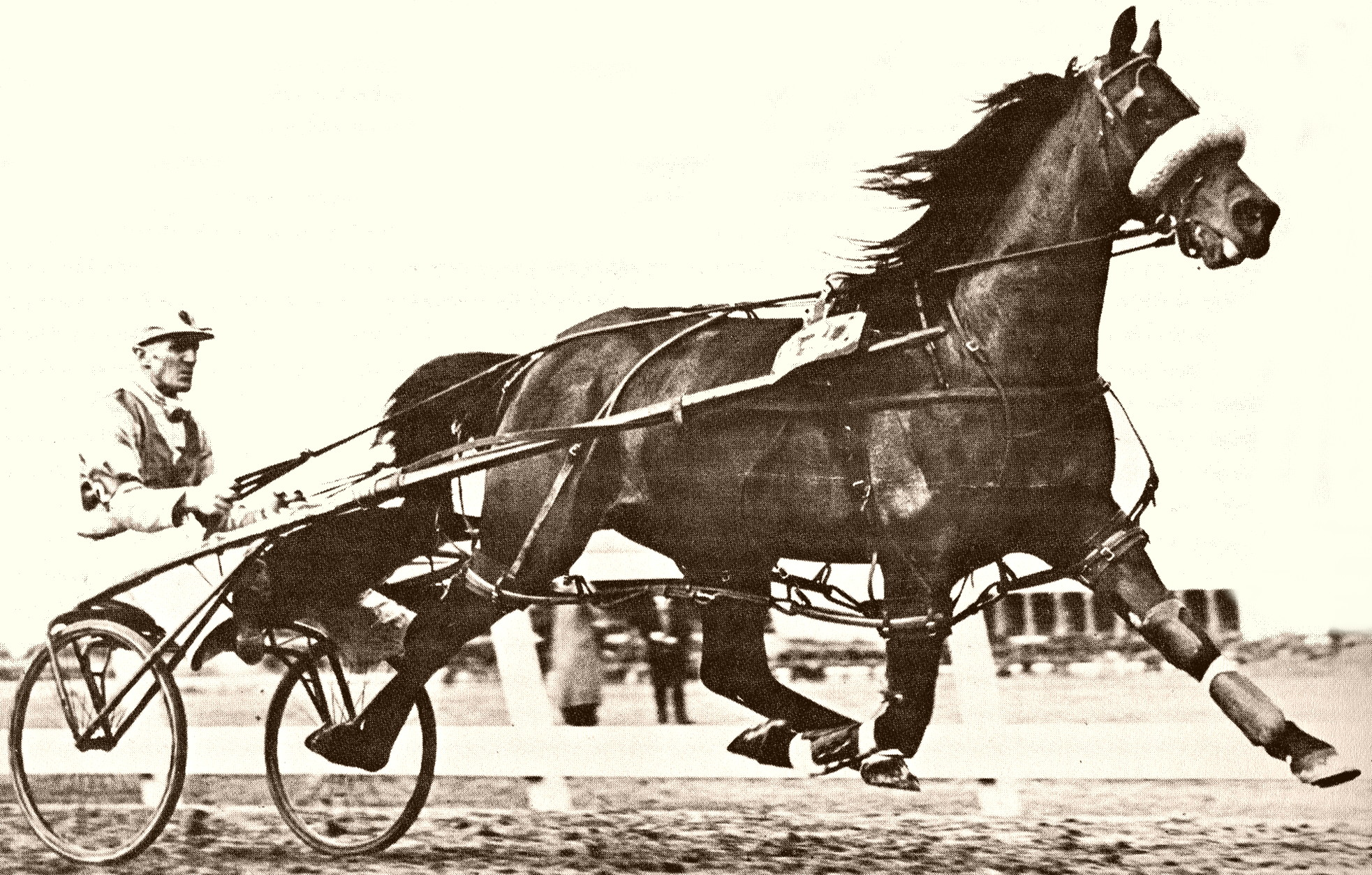
Springfield Globe

The New South Wales bred, Lawn Derby, racing un-hoppled, was the first pacer to break the two-minute barrier in Australia or New Zealand when he recorded 1:59.4 at the Addington track in New Zealand in 1938.

In 1952 at Harold Park Avian Derby became the first two-minute pacer in Australia. Ribands broke the two-minute mile in 1954 at Harold Park in a time trial of 1:58.7. He raced later in America where he took his total of wins to 41 and earnings to $82,385.

In 1958 Edgar Tatlow imported Meadow Vance (USA) by Adios from Subway by Billy Direct, who sired 328 winners and was the first Australian sire to get 100 credits under 2:10. Meadow Vance was also an outstanding broodmare sire.

Thor Hanover (foaled 1959, USA) by Adios was imported to Australia where he became one of the countries most important sires, having over 400 winners to his credit, including Gammalite and Rip Van Winkle.

On 13 February 1960 at Harold Park Caduceus from New Zealand defeated Australia's Apmat by half a length in the final of the Inter Dominion before a world record crowd of 50,346. In America, Apmat defeated their best performer, Bye Bye Byrd (the first harness horse to win more than $500,000) by a head in 3:07 for the mile and a half.

In 1963 Cardigan Bay from New Zealand, one of the racehorses, won the Inter Dominion Pacing Championship final in Adelaide before going to America. There he became the ninth horse worldwide to win one million dollars, (the first eight were Thoroughbreds).

The dual gaited, Mount Eden (1966) won eight of his eleven starts including, six successive races as a three-year-old (3yo), shattering a series of State, Australian and World Records in the process, including the world record 2:04.0 for a 3yo over 1½ miles (1970). His owners later accepted an American offer of $300,000, at that time the highest price paid for an Australian horse – Standardbred or Thoroughbred. Mount Eden was unraced in America owing to injury and retired to stud there but he was poorly patronized and returned to Western Australia.

Maori's Idol became the first Australian trotter to break two minutes with a time of 1:59.3. on 19 November 1977 at Moonee Valley. He was one of Australia's greatest trotters and he won 24 successive races before placing in the 1978 Melbourne Inter-Dominion Final.

Pure Steel, in 1977, 1978 and 1980 became the only pacer to win the A G Hunter Cup, three times and he also won the WA Benson & Hedges Cup four times. He was the first Standardbred to win A$500,000 in Australia.

San Simeon had a record winning sequence of 29 races from his first start as a two-year-old until his defeat in the 1981 Interdominion. He began his 29 race winning sequence by winning all 10 starts as a two-year-old. He was voted the 1978/9 Australian Two-Year-Old champion and the $50,162 he earned that season was a new Australian record for a horse of his age.

Popular Alm (1976-2000) was one of the fastest pacers Australia has produced, running exceptional times over many distances. Popular Alm set a world record for a mile time trial at Moonee Valley on 13 May 1983, running 1:53.2. He raced 62 times over seven seasons for 49 wins, seven seconds and three thirds for stake earnings of $710,883

Gammalite won 16 Group one races and became the first Australian bred Standardbred horse to win a million dollars in 1983. He was also the Australasian Pacers Grand Circuit champion during 1982, 1983 and 1984, and twice won the Inter Dominion Pacing Championship Grand Final.

The Australian pacing horse with the most race wins is Cane Smoke, by Smart Lobell (USA) out of Hondo Marie. This gelding had a total of 120 wins during the 1980s and early 1990s. He started about 400 times and recorded 34 wins in a single season. The second highest number of wins has been recorded by the legendary Paleface Adios with a total of 108 wins, followed by Destreos with 101 wins, Village Kid with 93 wins and the trotters, True Roman, a gelding with 73 wins and the filly Scotch Notch with 67 wins and winner of two Inter Dominion trotting championships.

Our Sir Vancelot (NZ) was the first horse to win three successive Inter Dominion Pacing Championships, during 1997-98-99 and also numerous Grand Circuit and Group One events.

Blacks A Fake won the 2006, 2007, 2008 and 2010 Inter Dominion Championships, making him the only four-time winner of Australasia's premier harness race and the world's highest prizemoney winning pacer.

Our Waikiki Beach ended a run on 19 consecutive wins on July 5, 2016 at TABcorp Park Menangle when he was beaten by Ideal Situation in a mile-rate of 1:52.8.

Australia was one of the last harness racing and Standardbred breeding countries to adopt Artificial Insemination (AI) as a legitimate means of equine reproduction.

=== EI outbreak ===
Equine influenza (EI) was initially discovered in a metropolitan Sydney horse complex in late August 2007, and spread to many areas of New South Wales and southern Queensland, mainly through the pleasure horse industry. This immediately stopped all equine pursuits nationwide, but soon racing in those states without EI cases resumed. The entire racing industry was put under great pressure because of a lack of racing for Standardbreds and Thoroughbreds.

== State by state synopsis of harness racing in Australia ==
=== New South Wales ===
Harness racing in New South Wales is controlled by Harness Racing New South Wales (HRNSW). New South Wales' premier track and metropolitan headquarters used to be at Harold Park Paceway, located at Glebe in Sydney until it was sold for over $150 million. This enabled a new state of the art 1,400 m track at Menangle to be built. Other major TAB tracks in the state include Newcastle, Penrith, Bankstown, Bathurst, Wagga and Young. On 17 December 2010 the last race meeting was held at Harold Park Paceway with Karloo Mick winning the final event. The winning post was sold for $10,000 to Ray Hadley with the proceeds going to Lifeline. Koala King holds the record for the most wins here, with his tally of 40.

=== Queensland ===
Racing Queensland control harness racing in Queensland. The state's major metropolitan track is Albion Park Harness Racing Club in Brisbane. Clubs are also located at Redcliffe Harness Racing & Sporting Club Inc. (UBET racing twice weekly) and country racing at Marburg. The Gold Coast track closed in late 2013 to make way for Commonwealth Games facilities; the Club is still in abeyance at 2016.

Queensland horses dominated many feature races around the country in 2006/2007, including the Be Good Johnny winning the Miracle Mile Pace, Blacks A Fake winning the Victoria Cup, the Inter Dominion and the M H Treuer Memorial.

=== South Australia ===
Harness racing in South Australia is controlled by Harness Racing South Australia (HRSA). The state's premier track is Globe Derby Park in Adelaide. TAB-covered tracks are also located at Gawler, Mount Gambier, Victor Harbour, Whyalla and Port Pirie.

=== Tasmania ===
Harness Racing Tasmania (HRT) is the controlling body of harness racing in Tasmania. The state's major tracks are located at Hobart and Launceston, with major meetings held in the Sunday twilight timeslot. Harness racing is conducted at the following Tasmanian clubs:

- Burnie Harness Racing Club
- Carrick Park Pacing Club
- Devonport Harness Racing Club
- Launceston Pacing Club - The Tote Racing Centre (Mowbray)
- New Norfolk Pacing Club
- North Eastern Pacing Club
- Tasmanian Pacing Club - Tattersall's Park (Elwick)
- St Marys Pacing Club

=== Victoria ===
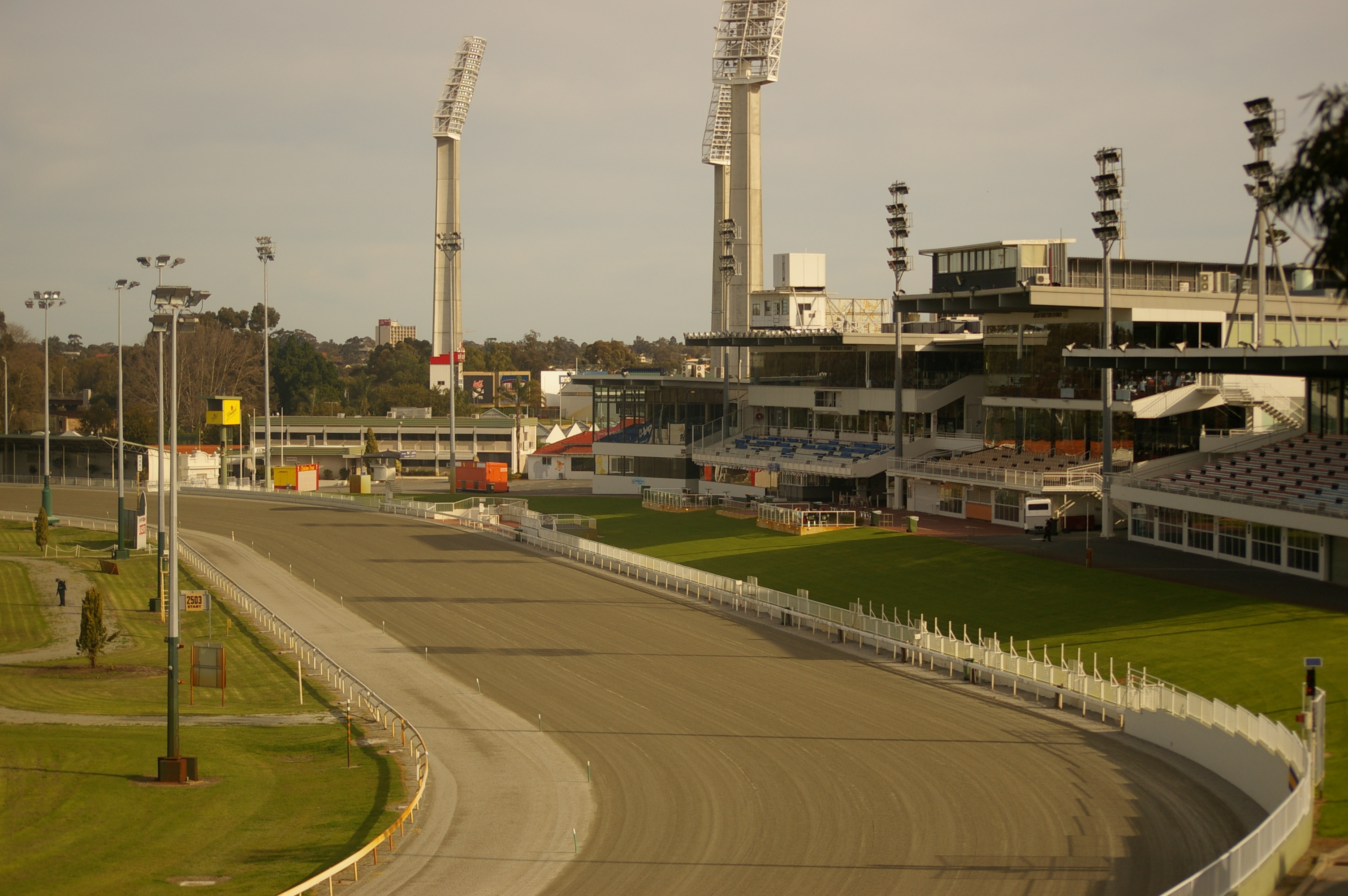
The main straight and grand stands at Gloucester Park, Perth

Harness racing in Victoria is controlled by Harness Racing Victoria (HRV). The state's metropolitan track is Melton Entertainment Park. Victorian harness racing meetings are usually held seven days a week, with major provincial tracks including Mildura, Cranbourne, Bendigo, Ballarat, Kilmore, Shepparton and Swan Hill. Vicbred, an Australian racing and breeding program with annual prize money and bonuses totalling $4.35 million and HRV's Free to Race policy were designed to encourage more owners into the harness racing industry. In 2009, Harness Racing Victoria opened Melton Entertainment Park at Melton, which incorporates a 1,000 metre track as well as a host of amenities such as restaurants, gaming machines, hotel accommodation and conference facilities. The new Melton track has replaced the existing metropolitan track at Moonee Valley Racecourse.

=== Western Australia ===
Racing and Wagering Western Australia (RWWA) is the controlling body of harness racing in Western Australia. Gloucester Park in Perth is the headquarters of harness racing in Western Australia. TAB-covered tracks are also located at Bunbury, Pinjarra and Northam.

== See also ==
- Glossary of Australian and New Zealand punting
- Harness racing
- Harness racing in New Zealand
