= Sumthingaboutmaori =

Australian Standardbred racehorse

- Sire: Pine Chip
- Dam: Maori Princess
- Broodmare sire: Entrepreneur
- Sex: Mare
- Foaled: 1 September 1998
- Country: Australia
- Colour: Bay
- Breeder: R MC D Healy & Co Pty Ltd
- Owner: Brian Healy
- Trainer: Brian Healy
- Driver: Gavin Lang
- Record: 75:31-8-8
- Fastest winning mile rate: At 2: TR2:05.4; At 3: TR2:03.7; Aged: TR2.00.9
- Prizemoney: $461,499

Group One wins
2003 2004 2004	Australasian Trotting Grand Prix; South Australian Trotters Cup; Inter Dominion Trotting Championships
- *Correct as at 1 November 2007

Sumthingaboutmaori is an Australian Standardbred mare. She won the Group one (G1) 2003 Australian Trotting Grand Prix, 2004 South Australian Trotters Cup and 2004 Inter Dominion Trotting Championship held at Moonee Valley.

She was owned and bred by Brian Healy and foaled in 1998. Sumthingaboutmaori was a daughter of Pine Chip, her dam Maori Princess (by Entrepreneur) was out of the famous Maori Miss family.

Her usual driver was Gavin Lang, although throughout her career other drivers were used. She was a horse that may not have had the success of other horses in other eras, but due to her racing nature she endeared herself to the harness racing public, which was highlighted in 2006 when she led out the field for the Inter Dominion final at Moonee Valley as highlights of her career were shown on a big screen.
