= Inter Dominion Trotting Championship =

for winners of the pacing event see: Inter Dominion Pacing Championship

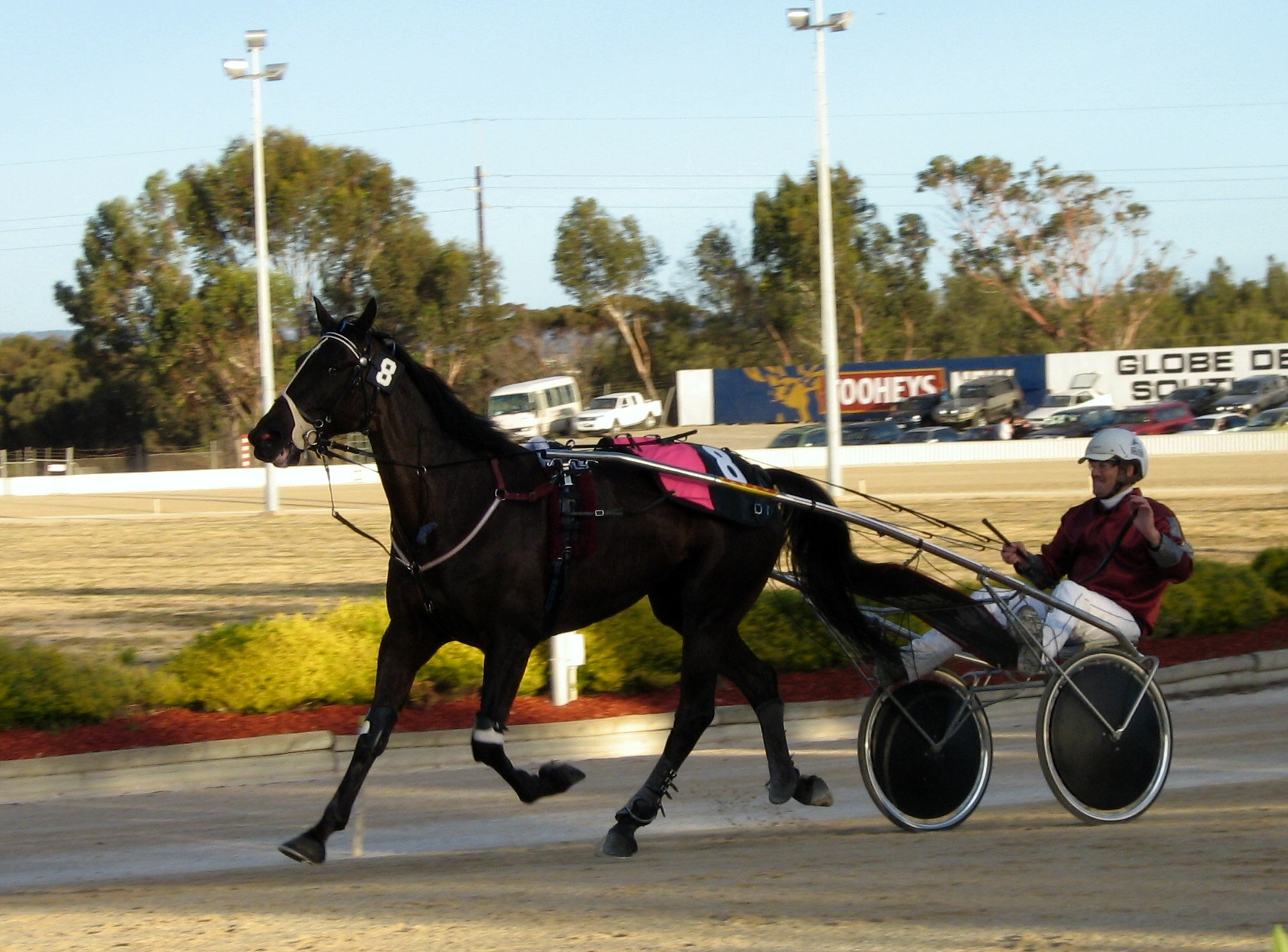
2007 Trotters Final winner Uncle Petrika taken immediately after his win

The Inter Dominion Trotting Championship Grand Final is a race for trotters within the overall Inter Dominion series. The series is an annual harness racing competition for both trotters and pacers that has been contested since 1936 in Australia and New Zealand. The host of the series is selected between the 6 harness racing states of Australia and the North and South Islands of New Zealand.

On occasions some Australian states had been reluctant to host the series with the pacers championship so it was held separately in Victoria. A meeting with leading Australasian harness racing officials led to a decision that the Inter Dominion Trotting Championship would be discontinued after 2012. Several new major trotting races were created to replace the series, most notably the Great Southern Star at Melton in March, which was to be run with a one-day heat and final format. However these Trotting Championship was re-introduced in 2018.

== Trotting Championship Winners ==
Year	Venue	Winner	Driver	Trainer(s)	2nd place	3rd place
2026	Albion Park, Brisbane	Gus	Pete McMullen	Chantal Turpin	Gotfeelingsyouknow	Toro Stride
2025	Albion Park	Arcee Phoenix	Chris Svanosio	Chris Svanosio	Bet N Win	Oscar Bonavena
2024	Menangle	The Locomotive	Brad Hewitt	Brad Hewitt	Keayang Chucky	Keayang Stuka
2023	Albion Park	Just Believe	Greg Sugars	Jess Tubbs	Mufasa Metro	Queen Elida
2022	Melton	Just Believe	Greg Sugars	Jess Tubbs	Majestuoso	Queen Elida
2021	New South Wales	Maori Law	Greg Sugars	Richard & Emmett Brosnan	Majestic Man	Just Believe
2019	Auckland	Winterfell (NZ)	Mark Purdon	Mark Purdon & Natalie Rasmussen	Majestic Man (NZ)	Massive Metro (NZ)
2018	Melton	Tornado Valley (NZ)	Kate Gath	Andy Gath	Speeding Spur (NZ)	Monty Python (NZ)
2013 - 2017	Not held					
2012	Moonee Valley	I Can Doosit (NZ)	Mark Purdon	Mark Purdon & Grant Payne	Vulcan (NZ)	Sovereignty (NZ)
2011	Addington	I Can Doosit (NZ)	Mark Purdon	Mark Purdon & Grant Payne	Let Me Thru	Stylish Monarch (NZ)
2010	Moonee Valley	Sundons Gift (NZ)	Chris Lang	Chris Lang	Kasyanov (NZ)	Skyvalley (NZ)
2009	Moonee Valley	Sundons Gift (NZ)	Chris Lang	Chris Lang	One Over Kenny (NZ)	Whatsundermykilt (NZ)
2008	Moonee Valley	Galleons Sunset (NZ)	Derek Balle	Chris Lang	Will Trapper	My Rhythm Of The Night (NZ)
2007	Globe Derby	Uncle Petrika (NZ)	Lance Justice	Lance Justice	A Touch Of Flair	Whatsundermykilt (NZ)
2006	Moonee Valley	Delft (NZ)	Tony Herlihy	Michelle Wallis	A Touch Of Flair	Whatsundermykilt (NZ)
2005	Alexandra Park	Play On (NZ)	Craig Thornley	Peter Lamb	Major Decision (NZ)	Pompallier (NZ)
2004	Moonee Valley	Sumthingaboutmaori	Gavin Lang	Bryan Healy	Martina H (NZ)	Sophocles
2003	Addington	Take A Moment (NZ)	Anthony Butt	Tim Butt	Castleton's Mission (NZ)	Sundowner Bay (NZ)
2002	Harold Park	Game Bid (NZ)	Gavin Lang	Brent Lilley	La Coocaracha	Waikare Gold
2001	Albion Park	Take A Moment (NZ)	Anthony Butt	Tim Butt	Mountain Gold (NZ)	Special Force (NZ)
2000	Moonee Valley	Lyell Creek (NZ)	Anthony Butt	Tim Butt	Africa (NZ)	Homer Hawk
1999	Alexandra Park	Special Force (NZ)	Todd Macfarlane	Dave McGowan	Africa (NZ)	Noopy Kiosk
1998	Harold Park	Buster Hanover	Tony Herlihy	Mark Purdon	Homer Hawk	Knight Pistol
1997	Globe Derby	Pride Of Petite (USA)	Tony Herlihy	Mark Purdon	Wagon Apollo	Knight Pistol
1996	Moonee Valley	Pride Of Petite (USA)	Mark Purdon	Mark Purdon	Chiola Cola (NZ)	Wagon Apollo
1995	Addington	Call Me Now (NZ)	David Butt	Paul Nairn	Pride Of Petite	Diamond Field
1994	Harold Park	Diamond Field (NZ)	Tony Herlihy	Roy & Barry Purdon, Clevedon	Fraggle Rock (NZ)	Lilly The Pink (NZ)
1993	Alexandra Park	Night Allowance (NZ)	Barry Purdon	Roy & Barry Purdon, Clevedon	David Moss	Levin
1992	Moonee Valley	William Dee (NZ)	John Langdon	John Langdon	Fraggle Rock (NZ)	Kwik Kiwi
1991	Alexandra Park	Fraggle Rock	Carl Middleton	Carl Middleton, Highbank	Tobago	Guardian Angel
1990	Addington	Real Force	Peter Davis	Peter Davis, Ardmore	Tyron Scottie	Highly Likely
1989	Moonee Valley	Yankee Loch (NZ)	Jim O’Sullivan	Jack Carmichael	True Roman (Vic)	Its Troppo (NZ)
1988	Moonee Valley	True Roman (Vic)	Gavin Lang	G Johannesen, Victoria	Fair Tally	Simon Katz
1987	Addington	Tussle	Peter Jones	C Irvine, Halswell	Melvander	Westham
1985	Moonee Valley	Scotch Notch	Graeme Lang	Graeme Lang, Victoria	Sir Castleton	Super Spree
1984	Globe Derby	Sir Castleton	H P Timmons	M S MacPherson, Windermere	Scotch Notch	Tussle
1983	Alexandra Park	Scotch Notch (Vic)	Graeme Lang	Graeme Lang, Victoria	Jenner (NZ)	Sir Castleton (NZ)
1980	Sydney	Hano Direct (NZ)	Doody Townley	Doody Townley	Courting Appeal (Vic)	Hampden's Pride (Vic)
1979	Addington	No Response (NZ)	Richard Brosnan	Richard Brosnan, Kerrytown	Albey Logan	Silken
1978	Melbourne	Derby Royale (Vic)	Cliff Powell	Cliff Powell	Bold Apepa (Vic)	Maori's Idol (Vic)
1976	Adelaide	Bay Johnny (NSW)	Perc J Hall	Snow Finn	El Cordobies (Vic)	Calm Meadow (SA)
1975	Alexandra Park	Castleton's Pride	John Langdon	Charlie Hunter, Cambridge	Derby Royale	Darky Forbes
1973	Harold Park, Sydney	Precocious (NZ)	Jack Carmichael	Jack Carmichael	Touch Merchant (Vic)	Bay Johnny
1971	Addington	Geffin	Charlie Hunter	Charlie Hunter	Beau Winter	Paula
1968	Alexandra Park	Stylish Major (NZ)	Doody Townley	C C Scott, Makikihi	French Pass (NZ)	Highland Flight (NZ)
1966	Harold Park, Sydney	Yamamoto	Colin Watts	Jack Watts	Gramel	Sugar N Spice
1955	Alexandra Park	Battle Cry (NZ)	Colin Berkett	Colin Berkett, Templeton	Vodka (NZ)	Precaution (NZ)
1951	Addington	Gay Belwin	R (Bob) Young	Jim Young	Signal Light	Dictation
1948	Alexandra Park	Aerial Scott (NZ)	R (Bob) Young	Jim Young, Addington	Toushay (NZ)	Willie Winkie (NZ)

== 2025 Inter Dominion (ID25, Brisbane) ==
Albion Park was chosen to hold the 2025 Inter Dominion. There were 2 rounds of heats scheduled (down from 3 rounds in prior years):

- Round 1 on Saturday 5 July 2025 with 2 heats for trotters and 3 heats for pacers, all heats over 2138m.
- Round 2 on Saturday 12 July 2025 with all heats over 2680m.

The Grand Finals and consolation races were scheduled for Saturday 19 July 2025. The Grand final raced over 3157m and the consolation 2680m. All races from a mobile start.

Horse	Trainer(s)	Final Qual. order	Notes	Heat 1	Heat 2	Heat 3	Heat 4	Race & bonus points	Barrier draw for Final	Grand Final placing
Alderbaran Accrux USA	Chris Svanosio	19		5th	x	x	10th	11	x	x
Arcee Phoenix	Chris Svanosio	5	3rd 2025 Hammerhead Trotters Mile	x	3rd	x	2nd	27	1	1st
Berriesandcherries	Brendan Barnes	17		8th	x	x	5th	13	x	x
Bet N Win NZ	David & Stacey White	3	1st 2025 Rowe Cup	x	1st	1st	x	33	4	2nd
Constantinople	Luke McCarthy	13		x	4th	x	7th	16	8 (2.1)	12th
Darcys Fireball	Graham Dwyer	33		x	x	x	x	x	x	x
Eurokash NZ	Graham Dwyer	23		11th	x	6th	x	9	x	x
Fenomenal	Darren McCall	32		x	10th	10th	x	6	x	x
Golden Sunset	Shawn Grimsey	10		1st	x	9th	x	20	6	9th
Gus NZ	Chantal Turpin	8	10th ID23	2nd	x	3rd	x	31	13 (2.6)	4th
Hammer Son	Doug Lee	27		9th	x	8th	x	9	x	x
Harry Stamper NZ	Joe Pace	7		x	5th	x	4th	17	9 (2.2)	10th
Hide And Seek	Shannon Price	24		x	7th	11th	x	8	x	x
Koda Da Moda	Graham Dwyer	25		10th	x	7th	x	9	x	x
London To A Brick	James Rattray	6	2nd 2025 Hammerhead Trotters Mile, 1st 2024 Qld Trotters Cup, 2nd 2024 The Great Square	12th	x	2nd	x	14	11 (2.4)	6th
Love Gun	Grant Dixon	20		x	8th	x	3rd	16	2	7th
Majestic Lavros NZ	Tayla Gillespie	15		x	9th	x	SCR	4	x	x
Not As Promised	Graham Dwyer	11	1st 2023 Victoria Derby	x	2nd	4th	x	22	5	8th
Oscar Bonavena NZ	Mark & Nathan Purdon	4	1st 2023 & 3rd 2024 Dominion, 2nd 2023 & 2024 Rowe Cup	7th	x	x	6th	16	12 (2.5)	3rd
Parisian Artiste	Alex Ashwood	12	6th ID22, 10th ID24	3rd	x	x	1st	28	3	5th
Sir Fahrenheit NZ	Daren Garrard	14		4th	x	x	9th	13	x	x
Taylad To Win	Grant Dixon	21		6th	x	x	8th	12	x	x
Te Rapa NZ	Graham Dwyer	26		x	12th	x	11th	3	x	x
Thebestbourbon	Trent Dawson	29		x	11th	SCR	x	2	x	x
Zealous Spur NZ	Grant Dixon	9	4th 2024 Qld Trotters Cup	x	6th	5th	x	15	10 (2.3)	11th

== 2024 Inter Dominion (ID24, New South Wales) ==
The 2024 Inter Dominion started on 29 November 2024 at Newcastle. There were 3 rounds scheduled:

- Round 1 with 3 heats for pacers and 2 heats for trotters, all over 2030m from a mobile start.
- Round 2 on Wednesday 4 December 2024 at Bathurst, all heats over 1730m.
- Round 3 on Saturday 7 December 2024 at Tabcorp Park, Menangle, all heats over 2300m.

The Grand Finals were scheduled for Saturday 14 December at Tabcorp Park, Menangle and raced over 2300m.

Horse	Trainer(s)	Final Qual. order	Notes	Heat 1	Heat 2	Heat 3	Heat 4	Heat 5	Heat 6	Points	Barrier draw for Final	Grand Final placing
Affaire De Cover	Troy Williams, NSW	31		x	8th	x	8th	x	7th	16	x	x
Aldebaran Vera	Margaret Lee, VIC	16		x	4th	x	3rd	x	3rd	31	2	12th
Aldebaran Zeus	Brent Lilley, VIC	4	Tony & Jill McGrath Golden Ticket	4th	x	x	2nd	5th	x	30	7	6th
Constantinople	Luke McCarthy, NSW	12		x	7th	5th	x	8th	x	19	E2	x
Courage Stride	Blake Fitzpatrick, NSW	24		x	5th	x	6th	x	6th	22	E1	x
Gus	Chantal Turpin, QLD	14	10th ID23	x	10th	SCR	x	x	x	SCR	x	x
Harry Stamper	Joe Pace, VIC	9		8th	x	x	SCR	x	x	SCR	x	x
Keayang Chucky	Paddy Lee, VIC	7		3rd	x	7th	x	2nd	x	30	3	2nd
Keayang Stuka	Margaret Lee, VIC	17		10th	x	2nd	x	4th	x	25	9	3rd
London To A Brick	James Rattray, NSW	1	1st Trotting Masters	9th	x	9th	x	x	SCR	8	x	x
Mufasa Metro	John Justice, VIC	3	Australian Trotting Grand Prix Golden Ticket,4th ID22 & 2nd ID23	x	6th	x	5th	3rd	x	26	6	8th
Parisian Artiste	Alex Ashwood, VIC	15	6th ID22	x	2nd	x	9th	x	1st	33	12	10th
Plymouth Chubb	Peter Manning, VIC	8	6th ID23	2nd	x	3rd	x	6th	x	31	11	7th
Queen Elida	Brent Lilley, VIC	6	2nd ID22 & 3rd ID23	x	1st	1st	x	x	2nd	45	5	5th
Royal Dan	Jason Grimson, NSW	5	Spring Sprint Golden Ticket	x	3rd	x	4th	x	5th	28	10	4th
Sleepee	David Aitken, VIC	20	8th ID22	x	9th	x	7th	x	x	10	x	x
Speedy Lover	David Aitken, VIC	19		5th	x	8th	x	x	4th	22	8	11th
Sunny Gee	Kerryann Morris, NSW	18		7th	x	6th	x	9th	x	17	x	x
The Locomotive	Brad Hewitt, NSW	10		1st	x	x	1st	1st	x	48	4	1st
Toro Stride	J & M Rando, NSW	13		6th	x	4th	x	7th	x	22	1	9th

== 2023 Inter Dominion (ID23, Brisbane) ==
The 2023 Inter Dominion started on 1 December 2023 at Albion Park, the venue for the whole series which is a 1019m left-handed all weather track. There were 3 rounds scheduled:

- Round 1 with 4 heats for pacers (9 starters maximum per heat) and 3 heats for trotters (12 starters maximum per heat), all over 1660m from a mobile start.
- Round 2 with 3 heats for pacers and 2 for trotters is raced on Tuesday 5 December over 2138m.
- Round 3 with 3 heats for pacers and 2 for trotters on Saturday 9 December over 2680m.

The Grand final was raced over 2680m on Saturday 16 December. The Grand final was won by the prior year's victor, Just Believe:

- trained by Jess Tubbs (her second Inter Dominion trotting championship victory)
- driven by Greg Sugars (his third win in succession)
- owned by Iona Trotting Syndicate
- bred by Yabby Dam Farms Pty Ltd.

Second was Mufasa Metro (trained and driven by John Justice) and Queen Elida was third (Brent Lilley and Chris Alford) as she had been in 2022.

Horse	Trainer(s)	Final Qual. order	Notes	Heat 1	Heat 2	Heat 3	Heat 4	Heat 5	Heat 6	Heat 7	Points	Barrier draw for Final	Grand Final placing
Adelle	Jack Butler	10		x	3rd	x	10th	x	x	3rd	21	12 (2.5)	12th
Bullion Harry	Chris Lang & Sonia Mahar	16		x	x	4th	x	8th	x	x	10	x	x
Call Me Trouble	Mark Rees	19		x	5th	x	x	10th	x	ret	7	x	x
Constantinople	Belinda McCarthy	4		3rd	x	x	11th	x	x	5th	17	9 (2.2) (E1)	x
Funny Face	Jack Butler	5		x	x	3rd	x	5th	5th	x	23	2	8th
Funky Monkey	Kerryann Morris	9		6th	x	x	DNF	x	x	x	3	x	x
Gus	Chantal Turpin	24		x	x	5th	3rd	x	x	8th	20	13 (2.6)	10th
Hatchback	John Justice	21		x	7th	x	7th	x	x	9th	12	x	x
Jaccka Watch	Shane Graham	18		8th	x	x	x	x	x	x	1	x	x
Just Believe	Jess Tubbs	1	1st ID22 & 3rd ID21	x	x	1st	x	1st	x	1st	44	4	1st
Majestic Harry	Darrel Graham	13	5th ID22	x	x	8th	6th	x	x	x	8	x	x
Majestic Lavros	Tayla Gillespie	15		x	4th	x	4th	x	x	6th	21	3	11th
Maori Law	Emmett Brosnan & Richard Brosnan (VIC)	8	1st in ID21	x	x	7th	8th	x	x	x	7	x	x
Mufasa Metro	John Justice	6	4th ID22	2nd	x	x	x	3rd	4th	x	29	1	2nd
My Ultimate Eddie	Mark Rees	25		7th	x	x	9th	x	8th	x	11	x	x
Ollivici	Chris Lang & Sonia Mahar	3		1st	x	x	1st	x	x	2nd	41	6	7th
Plymouth Chubb	Peter Manning	7		x	1st	x	x	2nd	2nd	x	38	10 (2.3)	6th
Powderkeg	Roy Roots Jnr	22		x	6th	x	x	6th	7th	x	16	x	x
Queen Elida	Brent Lilley	2	2nd in ID22	x	2nd	x	2nd	x	1st	x	38	5	3rd
Sir Fahrenheit	Daren Gerrard	12		x	x	2nd	x	4th	3rd	x	29	8 (2.1)	5th
Sugarinspice	Chantal Turpin	11		x	8th	x	x	x	x	x	1	x	x
Thebestbourbon	Grant Forrest	23		x	x	6th	5th	x	6th	x	18	11 (2.4)	4th
Van Sank	Shannon Price	14		4th	x	x	x	7th	x	4th	20	7	9th
Zealous Spur	Grant Dixon	20		5th	x	x	x	9th	x	7th	14	x	x

== 2022 Inter Dominion (ID22, Victoria) ==
The 2022 Inter Dominion started on 26 November 2022 at Ballarat with 3 heats each for pacers and trotters, all run over 2200m. The second night, Tuesday 29 November, is at Shepparton and the heats were 1690m. The third night, 3 December, was at Geelong and the races 2570m. On 10 December the finals are held at Melton and each race is run over 2760m.

The points awarded during the heats are: 1st (16 points), 2nd (13), 3rd (11), 4th (9), 5th (8), 6th (7), 7th (6), 8th (5), 9th (4), 10th (3), 11th (2) and 12th (1).

The stake for the trotting heats was $25,000 while the Grand Final was worth $250,000.

New Zealand's sole entrant in the 2022 series Bolt For Brilliance was withdrawn after suffering a fractured pedal bone, pulling up lame following his second place in his final heat.

Horse	Trainer(s)	Final Qual. order	Notes	Heat 1	Heat 2	Heat 3	Heat 4	Heat 5	Heat 6	Heat 7	Heat 8	Heat 9	Points	Barrier draw for Final	Grand Final placing
Adelle	Kerryn Manning	17		9th	x	x	4th	x	x	6th	x	x	20	x	x
Always Ready	Anton Golino	22		x	4th	x	x	x	3rd	x	4th	x	29	1.07	9th
Anywhere Hugo	Chris Svanosio	32		x	5th	x	x	x	4th	x	7th	x	23	1.01 (E1)	x
Beefour Bacardi	Emma Stewart	10		x	x	9th	x	x	SCR	x	x	x	4	x	x
Bolt For Brilliance	Tony Herlihy	1	1st in 2022 Rowe Cup	x	1st	x	x	x	2nd	2nd	x	x	42	SCR	x
Brandlo Prince	Chris Svanosio	20		x	x	6th	x	4th	x	x	x	8th	21	x	x
Chinese Whisper	Andy Gath	29		3rd	x	x	x	x	10th	x	6th	x	21	x	x
Cuchulainn	Chris Svanosio	24		8th	x	x	8th	x	x	10th	x	x	13	x	x
Hatchback	John Justice	19		x	6th	x	2nd	x	x	8th	x	x	25	1.04	10th
Ilawarra Stardust	Tony Peacock	15	5th in ID21	x	9th	x	x	6th	x	x	x	10th	14	x	x
Just Believe	Jess Tubbs	3	3rd in ID21; 1st in 2022 Bill Collins Sprint	1st	x	x	1st	x	x	1st	x	x	48	2.05	1st
Keayang Xena	Paddy Lee	30		x	x	x	x	x	x	x	x	x	x	x	X
Kyvalley Chief	Brent Lilley	21		x	8th	x	7th	x	x	x	x	11th	13	x	x
Leanne Leeann	Bob Kuchenmeister	33		x	7th	x	x	x	9th	x	x	6th	17	x	x
Lotamuscle	Matthew Craven	25		4th	x	x	x	11th	x	x	3rd	x	22	x	x
Majestic Harry	Stephanie Graham	5		x	x	3rd	x	8th	x	x	x	5th	24	2.03	5th
Majestuoso	Andy Gath	1	1st in 2022 Aust. Trotting Grand Prix; 1st in the 2022 Knight Pistol	x	3rd	x	3rd	x	x	x	x	1st	38	1.06	2nd
Mufasa Metro	John Justice	14		x	x	2nd	x	2nd	x	x	1st	x	42	1.02	4th
Nephew Of Sonoko	Ross Graham	5		x	x	5th	x	x	1st	x	x	7th	30	1.05	11th
Ofortuna	Craig Demmler	28		x	x	1st	x	x	7th	x	8th	x	27	2.02	7th
One Over All	Jess Tubbs	18		x	x	11th	x	x	6th	x	x	4th	18	x	x
Parisian Artiste	Alex Ashwood	11		5th	x	x	x	5th	x	4th	x	x	25	2.04	6th
Phoenix Onyx	Kerryann Morris	5		10th	x	x	x	9th	x	9th	x	x	11	x	x
Pink Galahs	Matthew Craven	3	9th in ID21	x	10th	x	5th	x	x	x	x	9th	15	x	x
Powderkeg	Lisa Miles	13		6th	x	x	11th	x	x	x	x	2nd	22	x	x
Queen Elida	Brent Lilley	5	3rd in the 2022 Bill Collins Sprint	2nd	x	x	x	1st	x	x	2nd	x	42	2.01	3rd
Robbie Royale	Brent Lilley	26		x	x	4th	x	x	8th	5th	x	x	22	x	x
Royal Charlotte	Paul Males	34		x	11th	x	9th	x	x	x	11th	x	8	x	x
Sleepee	Alison Alford	35		12th	x	x	x	3rd	x	X	X	3rd	23	1.03	8th
Sundons Courage	Chris Angove	9	3rd in the 2022 Knight Pistol	x	2nd	X	x	7th	x	x	10th	x	22	x	x
Swiss Miss	Shane Hoban	31		x	x	8th	6th	x	x	3rd	x	x	23	2.06	12th
Teetreetommy	Michael Barby	27		x	x	10th	10th	x	x	x	9th	x	10	x	x
Vacation Hill	Andy Gath	16		x	x	7th	x	10th	x	7th	x	x	15	x	x
Watts Up Majestic	Rickie Alchin	12		11th	x	x	x	x	SCR	x	x	x	2	x	x
Zarem	Carla Innes-Goodridge	23		7th	x	x	x	x	5th	x	5th	x	22	x	x

== 2021 Inter Dominion (ID21, New South Wales) ==
There was no Inter Dominion in 2020. The 2021 Inter Dominions were held from Saturday 27 November 2021 to 11 December 2021. The first round of heats and the finals were held at Menangle Park Paceway while the second and third rounds of heats were at Bathurst and Newcastle respectively.

Due to COVID-19 a significant number of horses, particularly from New Zealand, were unable to compete.

Horse	Trainer(s)	Final Qual. order	Notes	Heat 1	Heat 2	Heat 3	Heat 4	Heat 5	Heat 6	Points after night 1	Points after night 2	Points after night 3	Barrier draw for Final	Grand Final placing
Majestic Man NZ	Phil Williamson, NZ	1	1st in 2021 Aquagate Equine Centre Trotters Mile & TAB Australian Grand Prix	1st	x	x	6th	4th	x	16	23	32	2	2nd
Pink Galahs	Matthew Cravan, Vic	2	1st in 2021 Bill Collins Trotters Sprint & Darrell Alexander Trotting Championship Final, 2020 Victoria Trotters Derby Final	x	3rd	3rd	x	2nd	x	11	22	35	7	9th
Tough Monarch	Rickie Alchin, NSW	3	1st in 2021 Queensland Trotters Cup	x	6th	x	3rd	8th	x	7	18	23	4	4th
Maori Law	Emmett & Richard Brosnan, Vic	4		5th	x	2nd	x	1st	x	8	21	37	6	1st
Humble Ladd NZ	Alex Ashwood, Vic	8		x	8th	4th	x	7th	x	5	14	20	U1	8th
Funky Monkey NZ	KerryAnn Morris, NSW	10		9th	x	x	9th	x	SCR	4	8	8	x	x
Aldebaran Crescent	David Aiken, Vic	11		x	11th	x	4th	5th	x	2	11	19	3	scr
Robbie Royale	Brent Lilley, Vic	12		x	5th	9th	x	9th	x	8	12	16	x	x
Kyvalley Chief NZ	Brent Lilley, Vic	13		x	2nd	x	10th	x	2nd	13	16	29	10 (2.3)	12th
The Penny Drops	Ray Harvey, Vic	14		2nd	x	5th	x	x	1st	13	21	37	11 (2.4)	6th
Caligua NZ	Blake Fitzpatrick, NSW	15		x	4th	x	8th	3rd	x	9	14	25	5	10th
Empire Bay	J A & M J Rando, NSW	16		x	7th	x	7th	x	9th	6	12	16	x	x
Red Castleton NZ	Trent Lethaby, Qld	17		x	9th	11th	x	6th	x	4	6	13	x	x
Just Believe	Michael Hughes, Vic	20		7th	x	x	2nd	x	3rd	6	19	30	1	3rd
One Majic Kenny NZ	Blake Fitzpatrick, NSW	23		6th	x	6th	x	x	10th	7	14	17	12 (2.5)	scr
Revy Jay	JA & M J Rando, NSW	24		8th	x	8th	x	SCR	x	5	10	10	x	x
Illawong Stardust	Tony Peacock, NSW	26		3rd	x	x	11th	x	4th	11	13	22	8 (2.1)	5th
Lotamuscle NZ	Matthew Craven, Vic	29		4th	x	x	1st	x	5th	9	25	33	9 (2.2)	11th
Gil Favour NZ	Brent Lilley, Vic	30		10th	x	x	5th	x	8th	3	11	16	x	x
Sally Em	Grant Forrest, NSW	41		11th	x	10th	x	SCR	x	2	5	5	x	x
Indefensible	Rickie Alchin, NSW	35		12th	x	7th	x	x	8th	1	7	13	x	x
Timothy Red	J A & M J Rando, NSW	38		x	1st	1st	x	x	6th	16	32	39	13 (2.6)	7th
Enhance Your Calm NZ		32		x	10th	SCR	x	x	x	3	3	3	x	x

Horses that were in the final rankings but did not compete included:

- 5 - Keayang Livana - Margaret Lee, Vic
- 6 - Magicool - Rob O'Connell, Vic
- 7 - Cover Of Darkness - Emma Stewart, Vic
- 9 - Is That A Bid - Michael Hughes, Vic
- 18 - Majestic Simon NZ - Chantal Turpin, Qld
- 19 - Travel Bug - Jason McNaulty, Vic
- 21 - Brandlo Prince - Chris Svanosio
- 22 - Gimondi NZ - Blake Fitzpatrick, NSW
- 25 - Hatchback - John Justice, Vic

== 2019 Inter Dominion (ID19, Auckland) ==
The 2019 Inter Dominions were held in Auckland, New Zealand, hosted by the Auckland Trotting Club at the Alexandra Park track from Friday 29 November 2019 to 15 December 2019.

2019 Rowe Cup winner Sundees Son initially led the Inter Dominion Rankings for Trotters but was withdrawn in October 2019. Also withdrawn were Lemond and Kyvalley Blur who were initially ranked 6th and 9th respectively. After the first night trainer, Andy Garth, withdrew Mclovin due to a viral infection causing leg swelling.

Heats 1 and 2 on Friday 29 November were over 2200m with a mobile start and Free-for-all conditions.

- Heat 1 was won by Paramount King (Joshua Dickie, $28.00) from Massive Metro (Todd Mitchell) and Big Jack Hammer (Luke McCarthy) in 2:40.41 (mile rate - 1:57.3).
- Heat 2 was carried out by Winterfell (Mark Purdon, $7.70) from Marcoola (Sharee Tomlinson) and Majestic Man (Brad Williamson) in 2:41.57 (mile rate - 1:58.1).

Heat 3 and 4 on Tuesday 3 December were raced over 1700m.

- Heat 3 was won by Majestic Man (Brad Williamson, $2.80) from Habibi Inta (Blair Orange) and Massive Metro (Todd Mitchell) in 2:02.2 (mile rate - 1:55.6).
- Heat 4 was won by Temporale (Tony Herlihy, $2.90) from Marcoola (Sheree Tomlinson) and Paramount King (Josh Dickie) in 2:03.67 (mile rate 1:57.0).

Heat 5 and 6 on Friday 6 December were raced over 2700m.

- Heat 5 was won by Temporale (Tony Herlihy, $4.40) from Paramount King (Joshua Dickie) and Tough Monarch (Anthony Butt) in 3:23.81 (mile rate - 2:01.4 ).
- Heat 6 was won by Winterfell (Mark Purdon, $2.30) from Massive Metro (Todd Mitchell) and Majestic Man (Brad Williamson) in 3:20.55 (mile rate - 1:59.5 ).

The Grand final (2700m) held on 14 December was won by Winterfell (Mark Purdon) in 3:21.6 (mile rate - 2:00.1) from Majestic Man (Brad Williamson) and Massive Metro (Todd Mitchell).

Horse	Final Qual. order	Notes	Heat 1	Heat 2	Heat 3	Heat 4	Heat 5	Heat 6	Points after night 1	Points after night 2	Points after night 3	Barrier draw for final	Grand Final placing
Paramount King	22		1st	x	x	3rd	2nd	x	15	25	37	12	8th
Majestic Man	7		x	3rd	1st	x	x	3rd	10	25	35	4	2nd
Marcoola	3	2018 Dominion HC winner	x	2nd	x	2nd	4th	x	12	24	32	8	11th
Winterfell	13		x	1st	4th	x	x	1st	15	23	38	2	1st
Temporale	8	2017 Rowe Cup winner	x	4th	x	1st	1st	x	8	23	38	9	5th
Massive Metro	6		2nd	x	3rd	x	x	2nd	12	22	34	13	3rd
Habibi Inta	1	2019 Dominion HC winner	6th	x	2nd	x	7th	x	6	18	23	10	Scratched
Destiny Jones	10		x	5th	5th	x	x	5th	7	14	21	3	6th
Bonnie Highlander	19		x	6th	x	4th	9th	x	6	14	17	7	Scratched
Big Jack Hammer	5		3rd	x	x	9th	x	6th	10	13	19	1	7th
Monty Python	9		5th	x	x	7th	8th	x	7	12	16	5 (E1)	10th
Tough Monarch	2		x	7th	x	5th	3rd	x	5	12	22	11	9th
Valloria	14		4th	x	8th	x	x	4th	8	12	20	6	4th
C K Spur	18		7th	x	7th	x	6th	x	5	10	16	x	x
Sertorius	21		x	8th	6th	x	x	SCR	4	10	10	x	x
Pres The Belle	15		10th	x	x	6th	5th	x	2	8	15	x	x
Ronald J	16		x	9th	x	8th	x	8th	3	7	11	x	x
Kenny's Dream	20		9th	x	9th	x	x	7th	3	6	11	x	x
Didjabringthebeers	11		8th	x	x	10th	10th	x	4	6	8	x	x
Woodstone	12		x	10th	10th	x	x	x	2	4	4	x	x
Credit Master	17		x	x	x	x	x	x	0	0	0	x	x
Mclovin	4		x	x	x	x	x	x	0	0	0	x	x

== See also ==
- Harness racing in Australia
- Harness racing in New Zealand
