= Globe Derby Park (harness racing) =

Trotting track in the north of Adelaide, South Australia

- Globe Derby
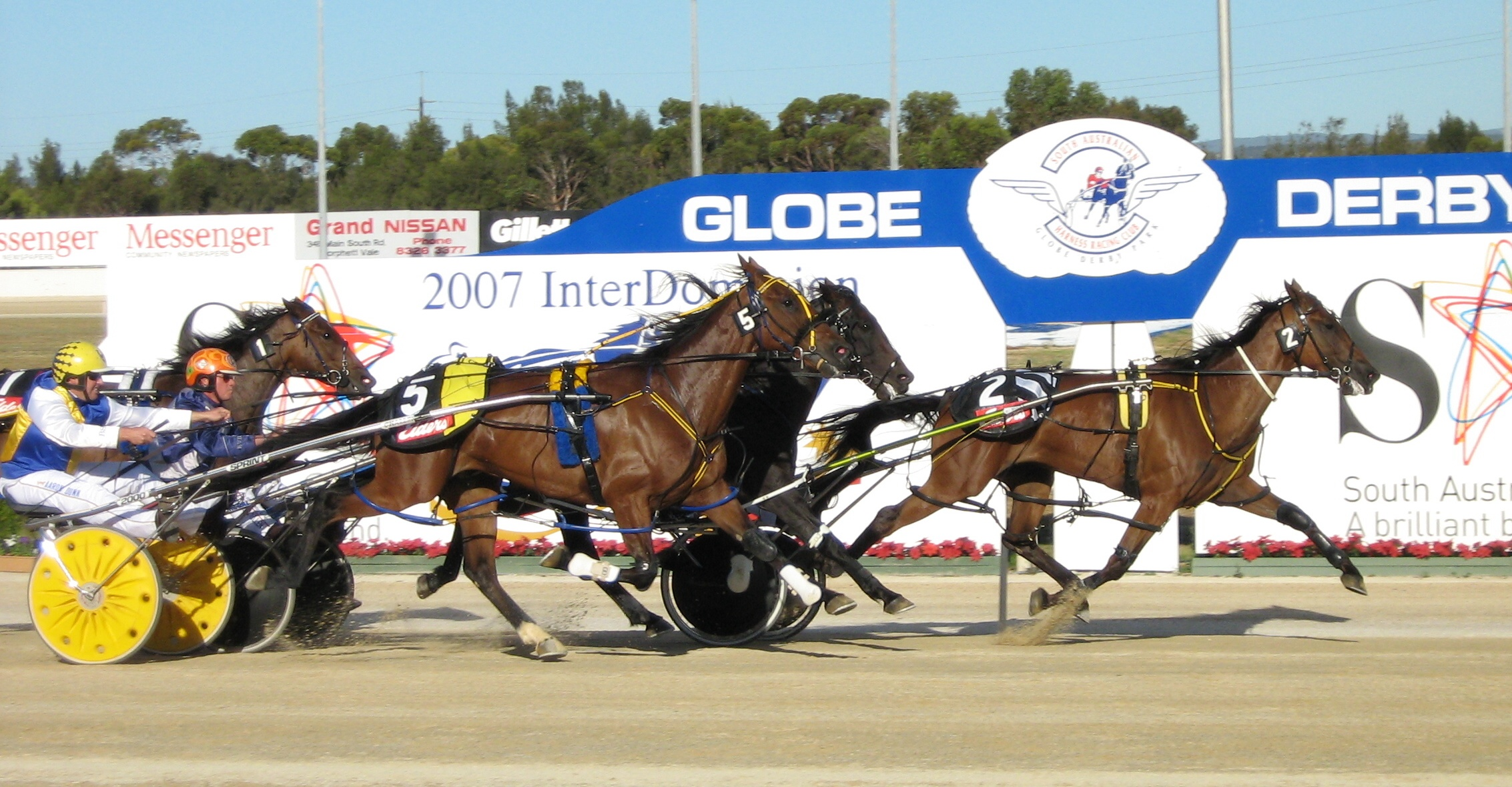
- 2007 Interdominion Championships at Globe Derby Park
- Interactive map of Globe Derby Park
- Location: 1 Globe Derby Drive, Globe Derby Park, South Australia 5110
- Coordinates: 34°47′41″S 138°35′35″E
- Owner: Harness Racing SA
- Operator: Harness Racing SA

Construction
- Groundbreaking: 1968
- Opened: 24 June 1969

Globe Derby Park (pronounced /ˈdɑːbi/) is a Standardbred harness racing venue in South Australia. It is located 15 kilometres north of the Adelaide CBD.

== History ==
The first public meeting was held on the afternoon of 24 June 1969. Globe Derby Park was named after the stallion Globe Derby, who was considered the most influential Standardbred sire in Australian and New Zealand during the late 1960s. Harness racing in Adelaide was previously held at the 510-metre long Wayville Showground from 1934 until all Adelaide meetings moved to Globe Derby Park on 14 April 1973. This was necessary as unlike Wayville, Globe Derby did not have lights installed for night racing until that date. Since then, Globe Derby has hosted the Inter Dominion championship on five occasions – 1976, 1984, 1990, 1997, and 2007.

== Facilities ==
The track has a crushed granite surface and is 845.50 metres in circumference, with the length of the straights being 150.90 metres. Races are run in an anti-clockwise direction.

Race meetings are held at Globe Derby Park every Saturday night and Monday afternoon of the week, and Friday nights as well during winter. Races are held all year round. Major race events include the Summer Carnival being held in January, Ladies Night Out in March, the Media Cup Night every May, and the Trotters Carnival held every June.

There are full TAB facilities and bookmakers on site. Meetings are broadcast on Radio TAB.

Other facilities include a large grassed area close to the action, trackside dining, and a bar.

== Redevelopment ==
In 2014, plans were drawn up to develop a portion of the Globe Derby Park land alongside Port Wakefield Road. In December 2017, the South Australian Harness Racing Club voted to sell off 70 per cent of Globe Derby Park to investment company GIC. This was a much larger land area than the initial plans in 2014 included, and it led to protests by some local residents.

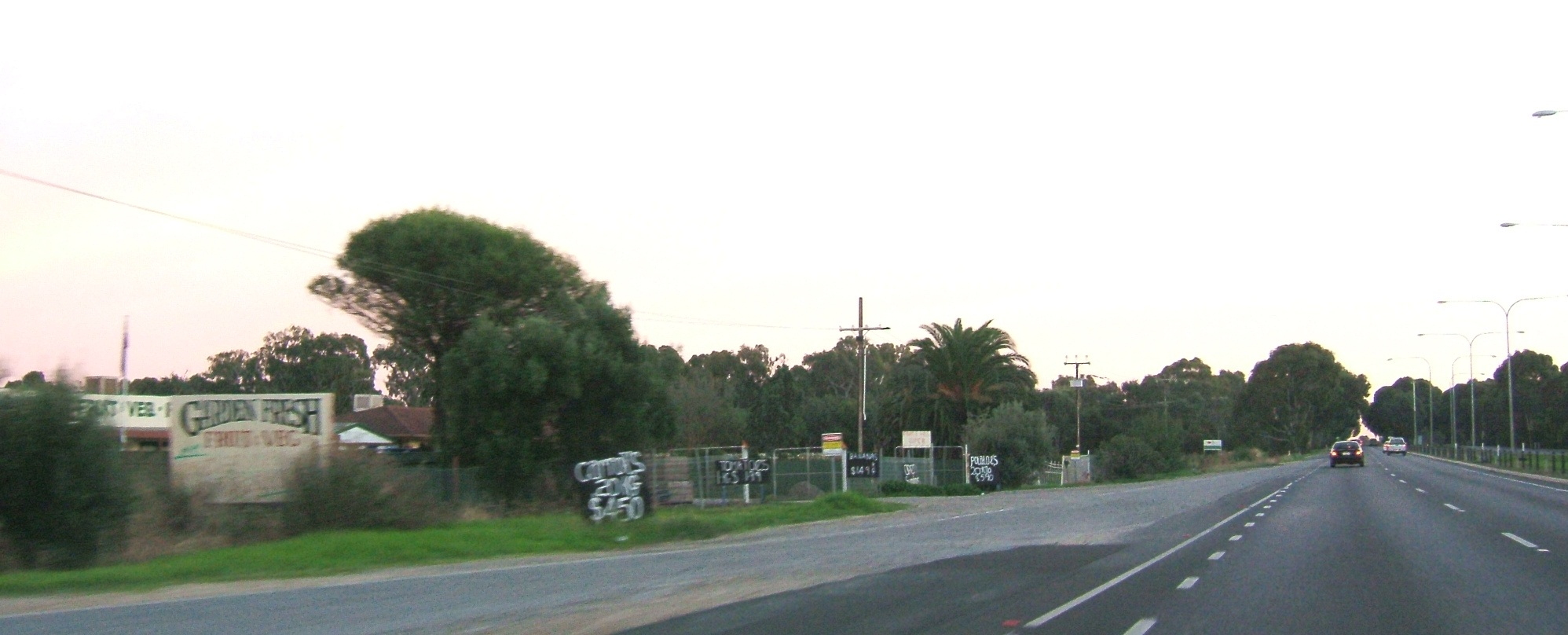

== See also ==
- Harness racing in Australia
