= Be Good Johnny (horse) =

Australian Standardbred racehorse

- Breed: Standardbred
- Sire: Fake Left (USA)
- Grandsire: Cam Fella (USA)
- Dam: Fleetwood Mandy
- Maternal grandsire: The Southside (USA)
- Sex: Gelding
- Foaled: 1 Sep 1999
- Country: Australia
- Colour: Brown
- Breeder: PC Fiechtner
- Trainer: John P McCarthy

Record
- 123 starts:48 wins-22-16

Earnings
- A$1,671,405

Honours
- 5 Grand Circuit Wins
- Last updated on: 2009-05-17.

Be Good Johnny is an Australian born Standardbred pacer trained, owned and driven by John McCarthy of Logan Village, Queensland.

== Racing career ==
He started his career later than most at age 5 coming second in a trial at Albion Park on 17 February 2004. His first win came in his next race 2 March 2004 in a C0 to C1 heat over 2,138 metres at Albion Park. The horse went on to win 24 of its first 27 starts, half of which were driven by John's son - Luke McCarthy.

Be Good Johnny stepped up to higher class races in the middle of 2005 just as the Australian harness season was about to begin in Queensland. Wins including the Red October final and Seymour Charity Cup final as well as placings in the Albion Park Final (2nd to Home of Jack), Sunshine Sprint (2nd to Cobbity Classic), Gold Coast Cup (2nd to Double Identity in a track record 1:53.5) and the Queensland Pacing Championship (3rd after galloping at the start).

Against quality fields Be Good Johnny had proven himself worthy of better things to come. Running a track record mile rate (1:56.2) at Albion Park for the 2680m gave him his first Australasian Pacers Grand Circuit win in the 2005 Trans-Tasman Cup. Be Good Johnny fought off the last-lap challenge of New South Wales pacer Dinki Di. Be Good Johnny made his first trip interstate for the Australasian Pacers Grand Circuit winning the 2005 Miracle Mile Pace and Victoria Cup. However, his tiredness from a season of rising through the ranks of Australian pacing showed by finishing 8th in the Interdominion held in Tasmania in April 2006.

After a spell following the Interdominion, he returned to racing in October 2006 winning the Gold Coast Cup in a mile rate of 1:54.0 (the best by any pacer in Australia this year). He went on to defend the title of the Miracle Mile Pace, making him just the sixth horse to achieve the feat (the last being Sokyola). The horse failed to place in the Victoria Cup and the 2007 Inter Dominion Pacing Championship final held at Globe Derby.

Be Good Johnny claimed his second Trans-Tasman in May 2008. Injury kept him out of the bulk of the 2008/09 season, but he returned to racing in July 2009. His last race was a distant 10th to Mr Feelgood in the Cordina Farms Sprint (Group 2) at Menangle in November 2011. Upon retirement he spent his days roaming a paddock of his former trainer John McCarthy.

== Notable races ==
Be Good Johnny contested the following during his racing career:

| Placing | Year | Race | 1st | 2nd | 3rd |
|---|---|---|---|---|---|
| 3rd | October 2005 | Queensland Pacing Championship | Slipnside | Romeos Legend | Be Good Johnny |
| 1st | October 2005 | Trans-Tasman | Be Good Johnny | Sky Flyin | Dinki Di |
| 1st | November 2005 | Miracle Mile Pace | Be Good Johnny | Slipnside | Robin Hood |
| 1st | December 2005 | Victoria Cup | Be Good Johnny | Dinki Di | Sting Lila Bee |
| 8th | April 2006 | Inter Dominion Pacing Championship | Blacks A Fake | Karloo Mick | Slipnside |
| 1st | October 2006 | Gold Coast Bulletin Cup (Group 2) | Be Good Johnny | Rollercoaster Road | Home of Jack |
| 3rd | October 2006 | Trans-Tasman | Sweet Fame | Sir Galvinator | Be Good Johnny |
| 1st | November 2006 | Miracle Mile Pace | Be Good Johnny | Blacks A Fake | Smooth Crusa |
| 5th | January 2007 | Inter Dominion Pacing Championship | Blacks A Fake | Winforu | Foreal |
| 1st | March 2008 | Australasian Plate Final (Group 2) | Be Good Johnny | Larado | Bold Cruiser |
| 1st | May 2008 | Gold Coast Bulletin Cup (Group 2) | Be Good Johnny | Good Looking Girl | Fleur de Lil |
| 3rd | October 2008 | HR Queensland Trans-Tasman | Blacks A Fake | Iron Hudge | Be Good Johnny |
| 8th | November 2009 | New Zealand Trotting Cup | Monkey King | Bettor’s Strike | Smoken Up |
