= Harness Racing Victoria =

Harness Racing Victoria (HRV) is a statutory body for which the Victorian Minister for Racing, The Hon. Anthony Carbines is responsible. Harness Racing Victoria's function is to administer, develop and promote the sport of Harness Racing in Victoria.

== Structure ==
HRV is operated by a seven-member Board which reports to Anthony Carbines, the State Minister for Racing.

It is managed by an Executive team comprising the Chief Executive, Matthew Isaacs, a Chief Operating Officer, Chief Commercial Officer, and four General Managers, each responsible for one of HRV's units.

Head office is situated within the RVL complex at Flemington Racecourse in Melbourne's north.

== Melton Entertainment Park ==
Melton Entertainment Park opened a new racing complex at Melton, which incorporates a 1,000-metre track as well as amenities such as restaurants, gaming machines, hotel accommodation and conference facilities. The Melton track has replaced the existing metropolitan track at Moonee Valley.

The bistro and gaming lounge was opened on 5 March 2009 while the first race was held on 5 July 2009. It was a VicBred 2YO Fillies Semi Final won by Lady Belladonna.

== See also ==
- Glossary of Australian and New Zealand punting
- Harness racing
- Harness racing in Australia
