= Melton Entertainment Park =

Horse racing venue in Melbourne, Victoria, Australia

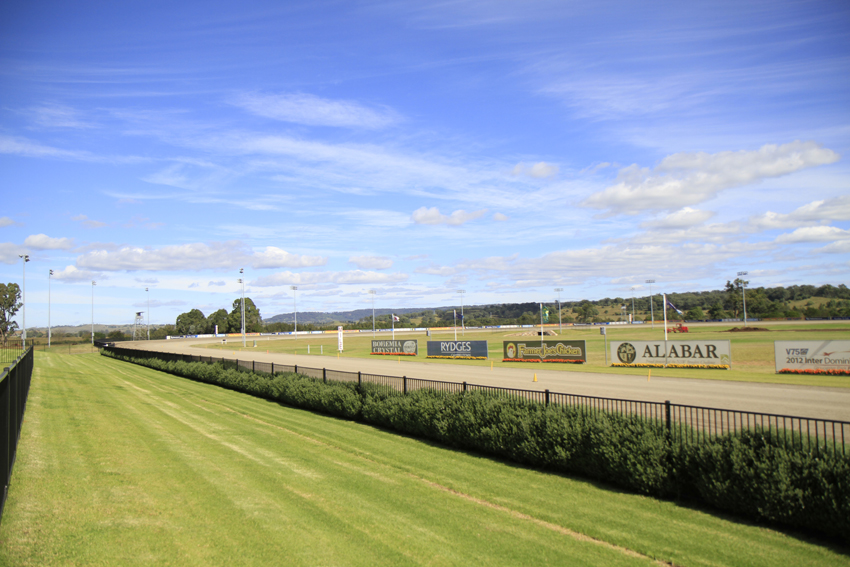
- Interactive map of Melton Entertainment Park
- Location: Melton, Victoria
- Coordinates: 37°41′51″S 144°36′13″E
- Owned by: Harness Racing Victoria
- Date opened: 2009
- Screened on: Sky Channel
- Course type: Harness racing
- Notable races: Breeders Crown; BIG 6 Hunter Cup; Victoria Cup

Melton Entertainment Park, formerly Tabcorp Park, is an Australian horse racing venue situated in Melton, Victoria, Australia; 40 kilometres (25 mi) north-west of the Melbourne central business district. It is used for harness racing and is operated by Harness Racing Victoria.

== Overview ==
Melton Entertainment Park incorporates a 1,000 metres (1,100 yd) track as well as a host of amenities such as restaurants, gaming machines, hotel accommodation and conference facilities. The new Melton track replaced the existing metropolitan track at Moonee Valley.

The bistro and gaming lounge was opened on 5 March 2009 while the first race was held on 5 July 2009. It was a VicBred 2YO Fillies Semi Final won by Lady Belladonna.
