= Inter Dominion =

for winners of the Inter Dominion see: Inter Dominion Pacing Championship and Inter Dominion Trotting Championship

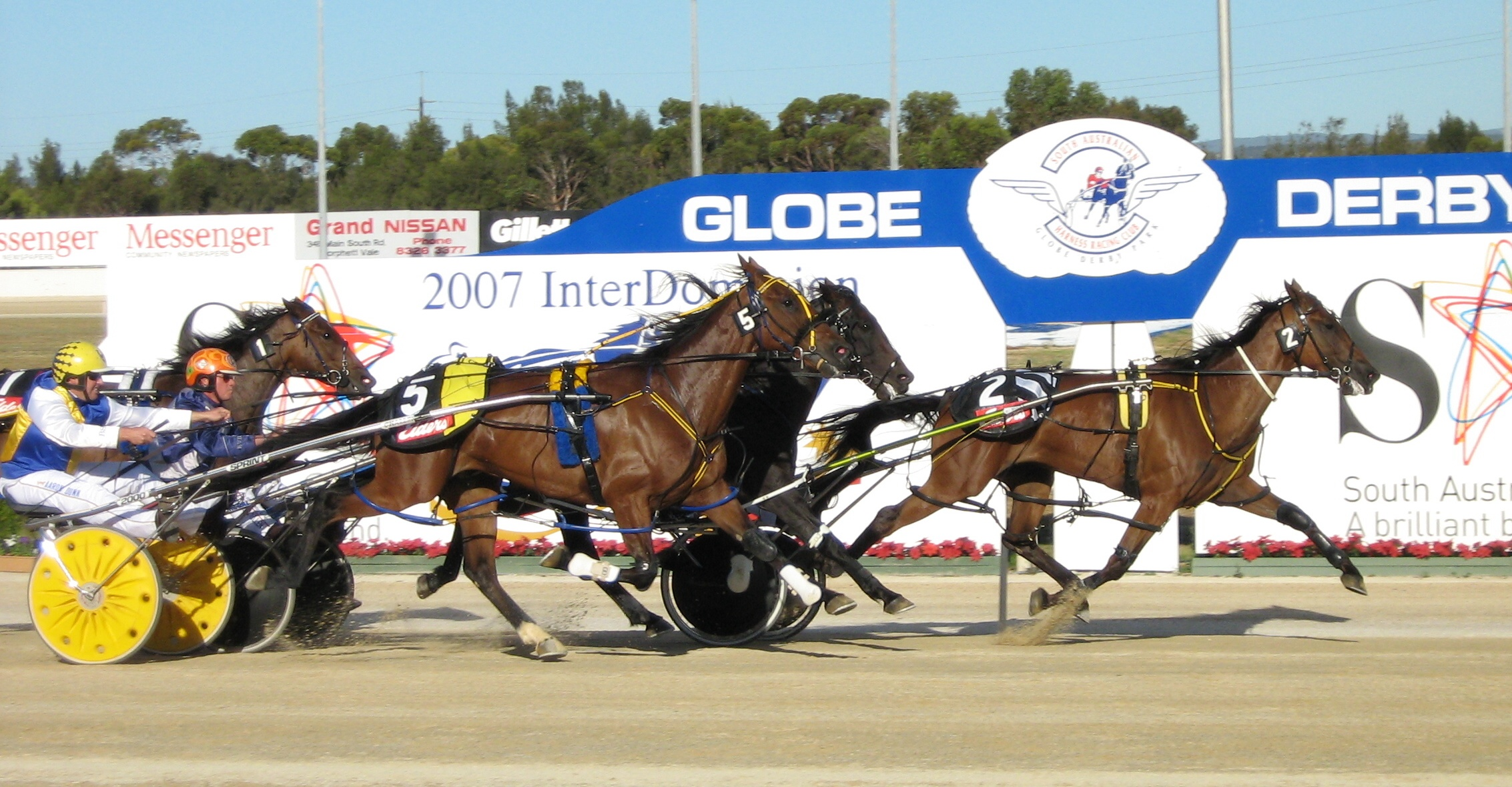
Action from the Pacers Consolation Final - 2007 Inter Dominion at Globe Derby Park

The Inter Dominion is a harness racing competition that has been contested since 1936 in Australia and New Zealand.

It is often referred to as the Inter Dominions or Interdoms for short as it generally encompasses two series:

- the Inter Dominion Pacing Championship for pacers and
- the Inter Dominion Trotting Championship for trotters.

The host of the series was rotated between the six harness racing states of Australia and the North and South Islands of New Zealand. The first Inter Dominion was held at Gloucester Park in Perth, Western Australia in 1936.

The 2011 series was held at Alexandra Park in Auckland, with the original venue of Addington in Christchurch deemed unsuitable due to the February 2011 Christchurch earthquake. The 2013, 2014 and 2015 series were held at the new Menangle Park Paceway at Menangle a village in the Macarthur region of New South Wales, Australia near Sydney. This was the first time a venue has hosted the event in three consecutive years.

== Traditional programming of the series ==
Traditionally the series was held over a two-week period with three heats held in the first week, over a sprint distance (1,600 metres - 1,900 m), a middle distance (2,100 m - 2,300 m) and a staying distance (over 2,400 m). The trotters series usually had two heats. The scheduling of the distances is usually at the discretion of the host club. At each round of heats there are three races to accommodate the number of horses in the series. The final and consolation are held usually around a week after the final round of heats. The usual distance is a longer distance in excess of 2,400 metres.

== Programming of the 2008 Melbourne Series ==
Harness Racing Victoria proposed a new system for the 2008 series that was accepted by the Interdominion Racing Council that rewards Grand Circuit race winners. Each winner of a Grand Circuit race and the Grand Circuit Champion from the time period from the last Inter Dominion all gain an automatic start in two minimum $70,000 semi finals with the balance to be made up from horse that qualify through heats of at least $25,000 held a week previous. The first five horses in each heat along with the sixth horse in the fastest heat qualify for a minimum $750,000 final. The prizemoney had been originally put to $1,000,000, but due to the dire effects of the equine influenza that crippled the industry the final prizemoney was reduced to $750,000. The trotters series consisted of two semi-finals and a final.

The trotting series was reduced to a simple semi and finals series raced over seven days. The semi finals were of $40,000 and the final was $250,000 which was comparable with previous series.

== Programming of the 2009-2017 series ==
The system used in Melbourne received much criticism and therefore wasn't chosen to be used in the 2009 series on the Gold Coast. The Gold Coast series had two rounds of heats and bonus points for winning major races. The bonus points races are not only include Grand Circuit races in Australia and New Zealand, but also The Graduate at The Meadowlands and the Canadian Pacing Derby, both open age races in North America. The prizemoney was also raised to $1,000,000 for the final. The trotters series remained as a two semi-final series held in Melbourne.

The 2010 series in New South Wales kept a similar format with no bonus points. The trotters series was again held in Melbourne. The 2011 series at Alexandra Park featured two rounds of heats for both pacers and trotters. A change to the points system saw points awarded only to the top eight placegetters - previously all heat runners earned points.

The 2012 series in Perth returned to the traditional three-heat format, while the trotters series was held in Melbourne, and was discontinued after 2012.

A new tender process replaced the rotation format and New South Wales won the tender to host the series from 2013 to 2015. However, a new structure saw seven heats run at different racetracks across Australia and New Zealand, with the winners and highest-ranked placegetters contesting a 14-horse final at Menangle.

The 2015-17 Championships were awarded to Gloucester Park, Perth, Western Australia. Gloucester Park planned to run the series over the traditional four night format in December for each of the three years.

== Programming of the 2018 series ==
In late 2017 Harness Racing Australia (HRA) confirmed it had endorsed a proposal from Harness Racing Victoria (HRV), Harness Racing New Zealand (HRNZ), and Club Menangle/Harness Racing NSW (HRNSW) to rotate the series between those organisations, starting in Victoria in 2018. The 2018 series commenced with Heat 1 at Melton on 1 December, Heat 2 at Ballarat on 4 December, Heat 3 at Cranbourne on 8 December, culminating in the Grand Final at Melton Entertainment Park on 15 December.

== Venues ==
- 1936 - Gloucester Park
- 1937 - Wayville Showgrounds
- 1938 - Addington Raceway (NZ)
- 1939 - Elphin Paceway
- 1940 - Gloucester Park
- 1947 - Gloucester Park
- 1948 - Alexandra Park (NZ)
- 1949 - Wayville Showgrounds
- 1950 - Melbourne Showgrounds
- 1951 - Addington Raceway (NZ)
- 1952 - Harold Park Paceway
- 1953 - Gloucester Park
- 1954 - Wayville Showgrounds
- 1955 - Alexandra Park (NZ)
- 1956 - Harold Park Paceway
- 1957 - Gloucester Park
- 1958 - Wayville Showgrounds
- 1959 - Melbourne Showgrounds
- 1960 - Harold Park Paceway
- 1961 - Addington Raceway (NZ)
- 1962 - Gloucester Park
- 1963 - Wayville Showgrounds
- 1964 - Melbourne Showgrounds
- 1965 - Forbury Park Raceway (NZ)
- 1966 - Harold Park Paceway
- 1967 - Gloucester Park
- 1968 - Alexandra Park (NZ)
- 1969 - Wayville Showgrounds
- 1970 - Melbourne Showgrounds
- 1971 - Addington Raceway (NZ)
- 1972 - Albion Park Paceway
- 1973 - Harold Park Paceway
- 1974 - Gloucester Park
- 1975 - Alexandra Park (NZ)
- 1976 - Globe Derby Park
- 1977 - Albion Park Paceway
- 1978 - Moonee Valley Racecourse
- 1979 - Addington Raceway (NZ)
- 1980 - Harold Park Paceway
- 1981 - Royal Hobart Showground
- 1982 - Gloucester Park
- 1983 - Alexandra Park (NZ)
- 1984 - Globe Derby Park
- 1985 - Moonee Valley Racecourse
- 1986 - Albion Park Paceway
- 1987 - Addington Raceway (NZ)
- 1988 - Harold Park Paceway
- 1989 - Gloucester Park
- 1990 - Globe Derby Park
- 1991 - Alexandra Park (NZ)
- 1992 - Moonee Valley Racecourse
- 1993 - Albion Park Paceway
- 1994 - Harold Park Paceway
- 1995 - Addington Raceway (NZ)
- 1996 - Gloucester Park
- 1997 - Globe Derby Park
- 1998 - Tattersalls Park
- 1999 - Alexandra Park (NZ)
- 2000 - Moonee Valley Racecourse
- 2001 - Albion Park Paceway
- 2002 - Harold Park Paceway
- 2003 - Addington Raceway (NZ)
- 2004 - Gloucester Park
- 2005 - Alexandra Park (NZ)
- 2006 - Tattersalls Park
- 2007 - Globe Derby Park
- 2008 - Moonee Valley Racecourse
- 2009 - Gold Coast Parklands
- 2010 - Menangle Park Paceway
- 2011 - Alexandra Park (NZ)
- 2012 - Gloucester Park
- 2013 - Menangle Park Paceway
- 2014 - Menangle Park Paceway
- 2015 - Menangle Park Paceway
- 2015 - Gloucester Park
- 2016 - Gloucester Park
- 2017 - Gloucester Park
- 2018 - Melton Entertainment Park
- 2019 - Alexandra Park (NZ)
- 2020 - not held
- 2021 - Menangle Park Paceway
- 2022 - Victoria: heats at Ballarat, Shepparton & Geelong, the finals held at Melton
- 2023 - Albion Park
- 2024 - New South Wales: heats at Newcastle, Bathurst & Menangle, the finals at Menangle
- 2025 - Albion Park
- 2026 - Albion Park

== Eligibility ==
A horse shall not start in a race outside the Championships except in a race held after the completion of all qualifying races. The Controlling Body of the State or New Zealand in which the Championships are to be conducted or the council may request a veterinary surgeon to inspect and provide a report on any horse scratched after final acceptances are declared.

== Trophy ==
A perpetual trophy is competed for. The conducting Club of the State or New Zealand in which the winning owner resides holds the trophy for a period until three months before the start of the next Inter Dominion Championship. The winner of the Inter Dominion Championship Final is presented with a trophy.

== Previous winners ==
=== Pacers ===
for a complete list of winners please see: Inter Dominion Pacing Championship

=== Trotters ===
for a complete list of winners please see: Inter Dominion Trotting Championship

== 1952 Inter-Dominion racebook ==
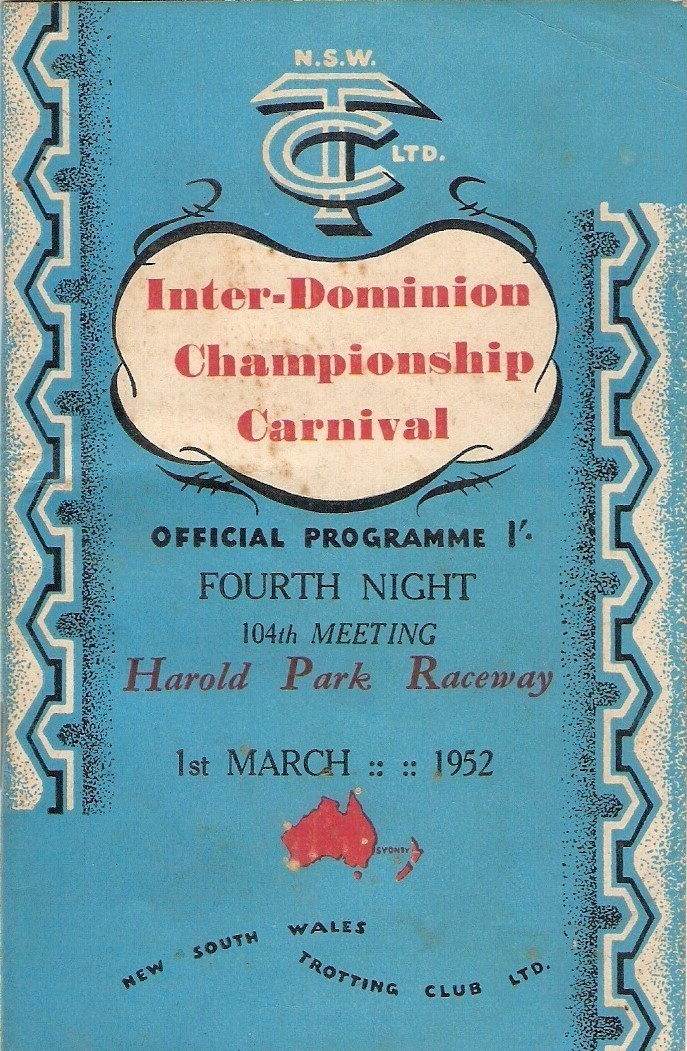
Front cover of the 1952 Harold Park Inter-Dominion Final racebook

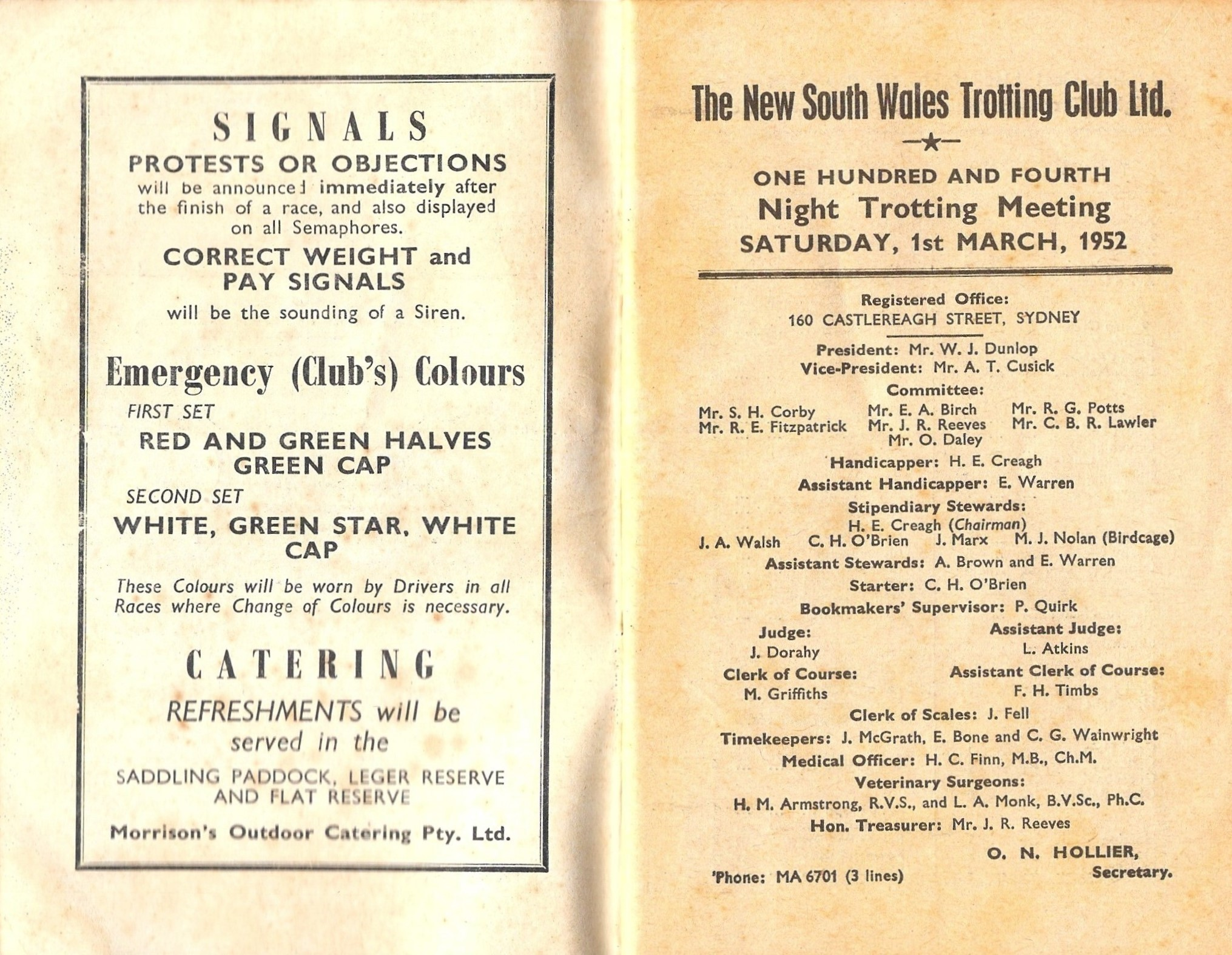
Inside cover showing race night officials

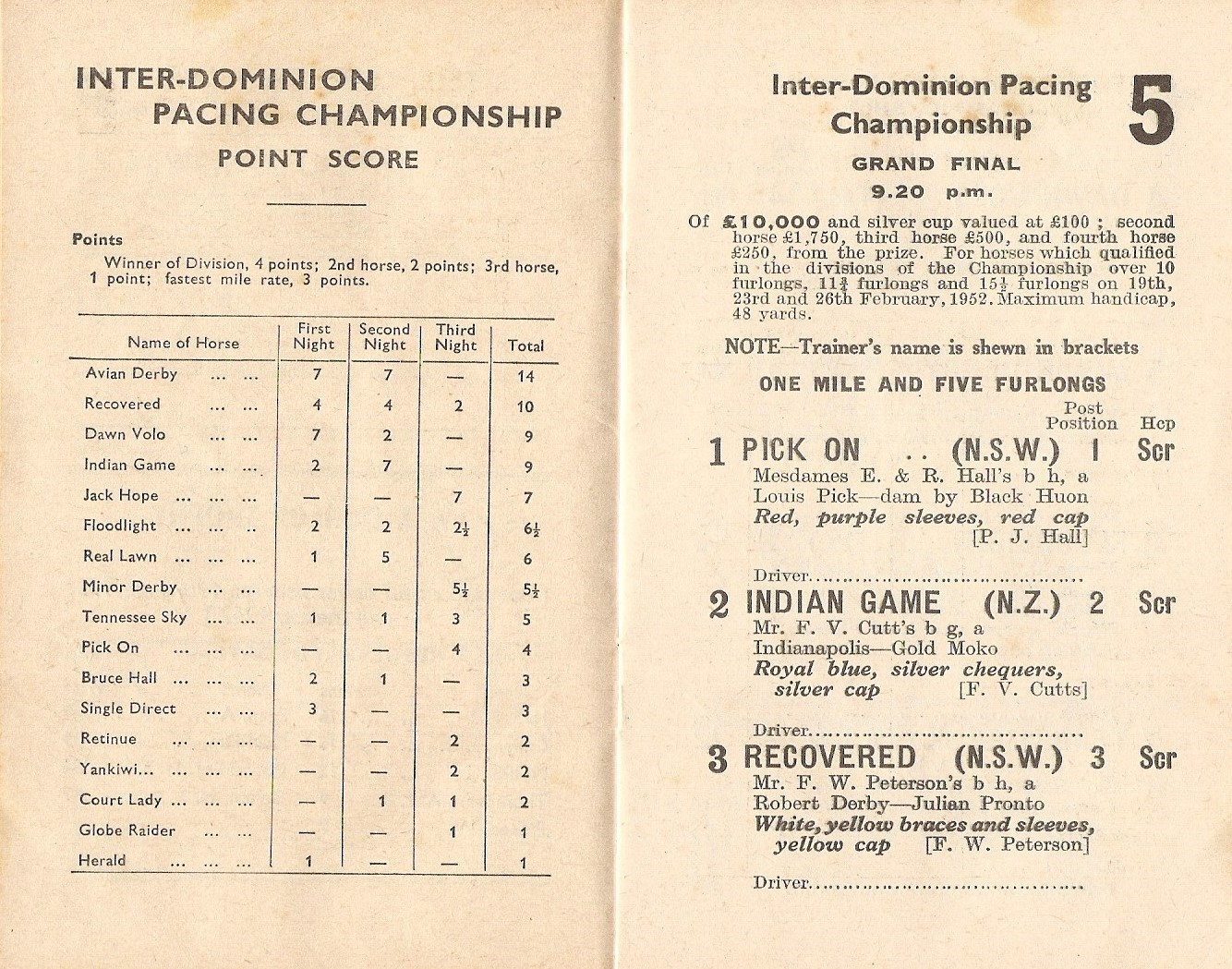
Racebook showing starters & conditions

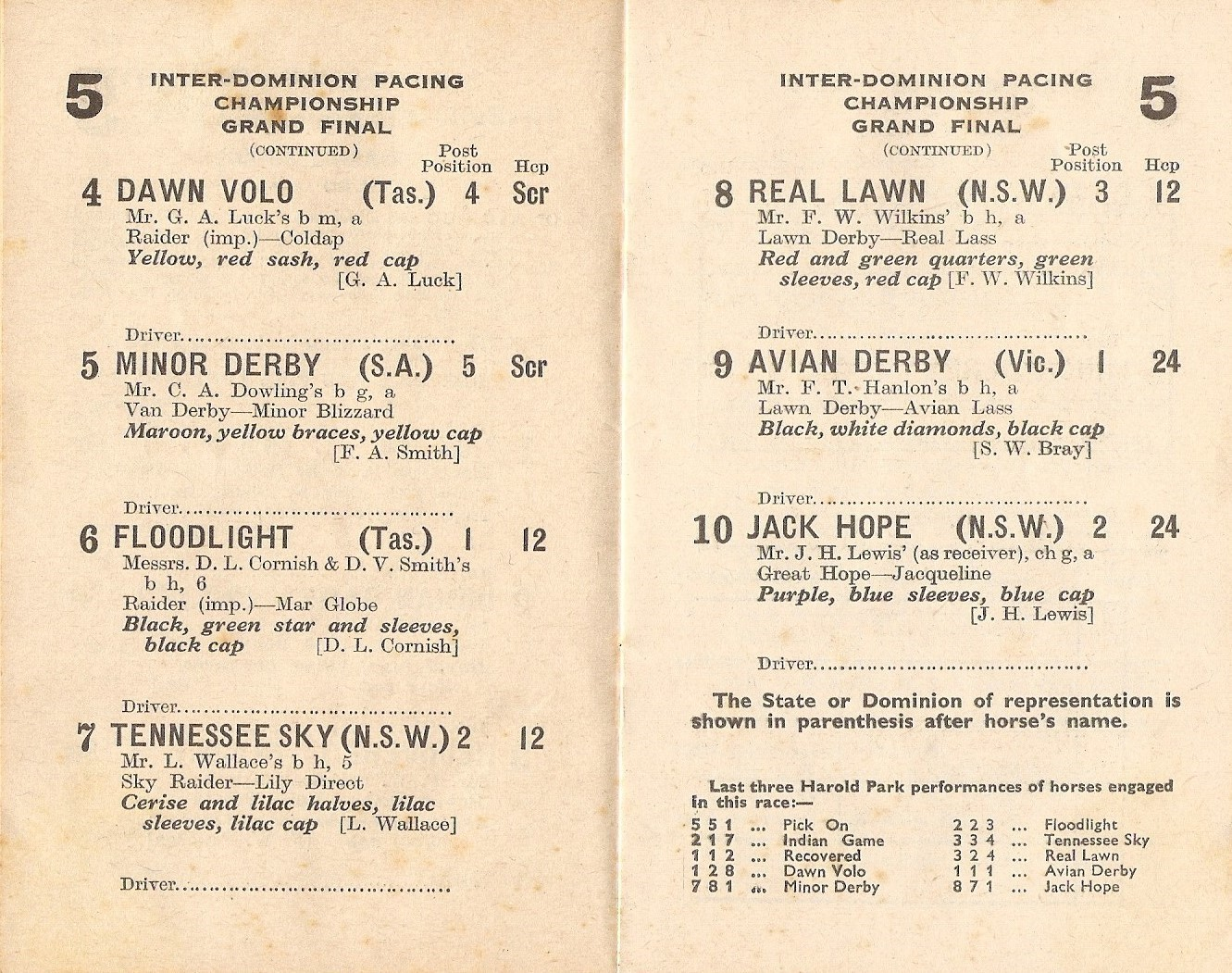
Racebook showing starters & the winner, Avian Derby

== See also ==
- Inter Dominion Pacing Championship
- Inter Dominion Trotting Championship
- Inter Dominion Hall of Fame
- Harness racing
- Harness racing in Australia
- Harness racing in New Zealand
