= Lombo Pocket Watch =

Australian Standardbred racehorse

- Sire: Jet Laag
- Dam: Misty Maiden
- Broodmare sire: Windshield Wiper
- Sex: Stallion
- Foaled: 16 October 2003
- Country: Australia
- Colour: Grey
- Breeder: Lombo Standardbreds
- Owner: Lombo Standardbreds
- Trainers: Graeme Tindale, Paul Fitzpatrick
- Record: 52:36-7-2
- Fastest mile rate: At 2: 1:56.9; At 3: 1:57.6; At 4: 1:55.5
- Prize money: $1,401,568

Group One wins
2006; 2006; 2006; 2006; 2006 2006; 2007; 2007; 2007; 2007; 2007; 2007	Bathurst Gold Crown (2yoc&g); Australian Pacing Gold (2yoc&g); Kevin Seymour Nursery (2yoc&g); Vicbred Super Series (2yoc&g); Australasian Breeders Crown (2yoc&g); Australian Pacing Gold (3yoc&g); Victoria Derby (3yo); Tasmanian Derby (3yo); Australian Derby (3yo); Vicbred Super Series (3yoc&g); McInerney Ford Classic (4yo); Golden Nugget (4yo)
- *Correct as at 13 November 2008

Lombo Pocket Watch is a champion Australian grey Standardbred colt foaled on 16 October 2003. Bred and raced by Western Australian owner Mick Lombardo, and was primarily trained near Cawdor by Paul Fitzpatrick, with son Gavin Fitzpatrick the regular driver.

In his first season of racing as a two-year-old, he won five Group One (G1) races and was voted the overall 2006 Australian Harness Horse of the Year, the first two-year-old to win the award and his earnings of $642,375 was an Australian juvenile record. As a three-year-old, he won another five Group One races including three of the prestigious derbies and was voted 2007 Australian 3yo Pacer of the Year. As a four-year-old, he won another two Group One races to bring his total to 12 Group One races, and a combined 36 race wins and prize money of A$1,401,568.

He stood at stud at Concorde Park in Victoria, Australia, before being brought back into training as a late five-year-old. Lombo Pocket Watch finally retired for good in 2012, ending his career with over 40 wins.

== Overview ==
Nicknamed The Grey Bullet, and known as The People's Champion he was the youngest ever Australasian bred pacer to reach $1 million when he broke through the barrier in winning the Vicbred Super Series for three-year-old colts and geldings.

In his first two full seasons of racing Lombo Pocket Watch has amassed many awards including 2006 Australian Harness Horse of the Year, as well as the 2006 Australian two-year-old (2yo) Pacer of the Year, Lombo Pocket Watch backed up and won the 2007 Australian 3yo Pacer of the Year. In his two-year-old season Lombo Pocket Watch became the highest earning 2yo in Australia and his 18 wins put him 3rd on the all-time most season wins for a 2yo. In his 3yo season Pocket Watch broke the all-time stakes winners for 3yo pacers. Lombo Pocket Watch currently sits at 19th on the all-time stakes winners list, and Australasia's youngest millionaire pacer. Lombo Pocket Watch was retired to stud after winning a 12 Group One races including the time honoured, prestigious Victoria Derby, as well as the $285,000 two-year-old colts and geldings Australian Pacing Gold and the $284,000 two-year-old Pacing Colts & Geldings Australasian Breeders Crown.

== Breeding and naming ==
Lombo Pocket Watch was sired by the United States horse Jet Laag who was sired by Laag, out of the Windshield Wiper Australian bred mare Misty Maiden. Misty Maiden won a total of 12 races and $245,449 including the 1992 Australian Derby, a race that her son won in 2007 as well as claiming the 1992 Australian 3yo Pacer of the Year. These achievements make them the only mother and son to have won overall Australian 3yo Pacer of the Year as well as the Australian Derby.

His breeder, Mick Lombadro, names all of the horses he breeds with "Lombo" as a prefix or suffix, registering all the horses before selling many at yearling sales.

== Two-year-old season (2005–2006) ==
After recording two wins from three starts in Western Australia, failing to complete the course at his second start when driver Chris Lewis pulled him out of a race at Perth's Gloucester Park, Lombo Pocket Watch was transferred to New South Wales for some major races.

Driven in his first start at Harold Park Racetrack by Gavin Fitzpatrick, Lombo Pocket Watch was sent out at long odds of $27.80 on local totes in the NSW Sapling Stakes. He won a 5 m victory in a mile rate of 2.01.1. Lombo Pocket Watch was then transferred to the care of Paul Fitzpatrick at Cawdor to continue his racing. For his first start for Fitzpatrick Lombo Pocket Watch headed for the Linden Huntly Memorial, a series for two-year-old colts and geldings at Bulli, in New South Wales. For the first time in his career he completed a series clean sweep in winning a heat on the Monday, followed by a victory in the Group Two event worth $50,000 on the Saturday night.

In the Bathurst Gold Crown at Bathurst, a heat and final series, Lombo Pocket Watch won his heat by 12.4 m and was the second elect in the $100,000 final, behind stablemate Lombo Mandingo. Fitzpatrick elected to drive Lombo Mandingo in the final and freelance driver Greg Bennett picked up the drive on Lombo Pocket Watch. Lombo Pocket Watch won in a photo finish by a neck, giving him his first Group One race.

With Fitzpatrick back in the sulky, Lombo Pocket Watch won a $20,000 heat of the Australian Pacing Gold Series for two-year-old colts and geldings at Harold Park. The $285,000 Group One final was conducted at Albion Park, the home of Queensland harness racing on 13 May 2006. Lombo Pocket Watch collected the $150,000 winners cheque in a mile rate of 1.56.9, beating Twelve Paces by a half head. Lombo Pocket Watch next contested the Kevin Seymour Nursery. In another heat and final series Lombo Pocket Watch won his heat in 1.59.5 and the final in 1.59.2.

Pocket Watch then contested the Vicbred Super Series. He won his heat at Shepparton and his semi-final at Moonee Valley on 7 July 2006 in 2.03.3 despite a slow early pace. On 14 July 2006 Lombo Pocket Watch competed in the Group One, $100,000 final. Starting in barrier 2 outside stablemate Lombo Mandingo, Pocket Watch began well and Fitzpatrick pushed for the lead which was surrendered by Lombo Mandingo and Fitzpatrick's brother Blake. Pocket Watch cleared out to win by 13.5 m from Lombo Mandingo in a time of 1.57.9.

Lombo Pocket Watch's final series of the season was the Australasian Breeders Crown. He was favorite to take the Group One, $284,000 final even before the series started. After an easy heat win at Harold Park over Lively Exit, Lombo Pocket Watch headed to the semi-finals at Ballarat in country Victoria. The semi final turned into a 400 m sprint when the leaders dawdled resulting in a flying 27.9 second final quarter, but a mile rate of 2.02.7. Pocket Watch won the final at Ballarat 20 August 2006 beating Gotta Go Cullen.

Lombo Pocket Watch was named 2yo Colt/Gelding Pacer of the Year, as well as the overall Australian 2yo Pacer of the Year, and also the prestigious 2006 Australian Harness Horse of the Year, for a season that included 17 wins from 18 race starts, 5 Group One victories and $642,375 in prize money. He was also named the 2006 Victorian 2yo Pacing Colt/Gelding of the Year, as well as the 2006 Victorian Horse of the Year, both Victorian awards based only on his Victorian races which included 2 Group one victories. Pocket Watch's dam, Misty Maiden was awarded the 2006 Winona Award for the Australian Broodmare of the Year.

== Three-year-old season (2006–2007) ==
Lombo Pocket Watch opened his three-year-old season at Moonee Valley with a win in a heat of the Australian Pacing Gold series and proceeded to win the Group 1 final comfortably. His next assignment was the Group 2 Victorian Sires Classic in which he held off a fast finishing Lively Exit to extend is unbeaten streak to 19 wins in a row.

In his heat of the Victoria Derby Lombo Pocket Watch was beaten by Twelve Paces. Despite his defeat, he qualified for the $150,000 Group One Final, which he won in time of 1.59.2 with a last 800 m of the 2575 m event in 57.2.

Lombo Pocket Watch was then sent to New Zealand to contest the Great Northern Derby at Alexandra Park in Auckland. He ran poorly in the qualifiers, finishing fourth. In the Group One $200,000NZD final he finished second to Changeover. On his return from New Zealand, Pocket Watch contested the Tasmanian Derby, held at Elwick Racecourse in Hobart on 1 April 2007. He dominated the competition, winning in 1.59.7. Pocket Watch remained in Tasmania to contest the Australian Derby at the Launceston circuit a week later. Facing stronger opposition, including Lively Exit, Pocket Watch produced another dominant performance to win with a final quarter of 27.5 seconds.

On his return to the Australian mainland, Pocket Watch contested the New South Wales Derby. Although the race organisers had granted Pocket Watch a place in the final, his owner elected to run the horse in the qualifiers. He finished third in the qualifier, being apparently unsuited by the slow early pace. s respectively. This saw him suffer only his fifth defeat in finishing third beaten by only 1.5 m. In the final a week later at Glebe circuit Pocket Watch again failed to reproduce his best form, finishing fifth behind Gotta Go Cullen, Twelve Paces and Lively Exit. Pocket Watch then contested the three-year-old colts and geldings category of the Vicbred Super Series for horses bred in Victoria. On 25 May 2007 he won the semi-final at Moonee Valley Racecourse in 1.57.7. In the final a week later he recorded his tenth Group One victory in a time of 1.58.7. The win made him the first three-year-old in Australasia to break the $1 million barrier and therefore the youngest ever Australasian millionaire standardbred horse.

Pocket Watch won the Newcastle Guineas and then attempted his fourth Derby victory in the Queensland Derby. In an even run race at Albion Park Pocket Watch was beaten by Queenslander Arkamigo after being caught three wide early. In the Australasian Breeders Crown series for three-year-old colts and geldings Pocket Watch won his heat at Harold Park and the semi-final, at Ballarat Victoria. On 19 August, Pocket Watch again clashed with Changeover in the much anticipated final, but finished fourth, after being unable to recover from a poor barrier draw.

Lombo Pocket Watch was awarded the 2007 Australian 3yo Colt/Gelding of the Year, as well as the Australian 3yo Pacer of the Year, for a season that included 19 starts in Australia and New Zealand, for 12 Australian wins and a total of $452,478. Pocket Watch also received the 2007 Victorian 3yo Pacing Colt/Gelding of the Year, based only on his Victorian results which included 3 Group One races.

== Four-year-old season (2007–2008) ==
Pocket Watch started out his four-year-old season on a winning note, taking out a prelude of the Golden Nugget, a group one race for four-year-olds, at Gloucester Park in Perth and in doing so qualified for the final. The following week Pocket Watch backed up in the McInerney Ford Classic, a lead up to the Golden Nugget, worth $100,000 and carrying Group One status for the first time. He won in a time of 1.57.9. Pocket Watch started favourite for the Group One Golden Nugget at Gloucester Park in Perth on 14 December 2007. Despite being badly paced in the early stages, moved around the field and cleared out by 11 m by the winning post.

In late December 2007, speculation was rife that Lombo Pocket Watch may be headed to the WA Pacing Cup, held on 11 January 2008, due to his excellent form and the inability of horses from the Eastern States of Australia to attend the Group One $400,000 classic due to equine influenza. After his emphatic victory in the Golden Nugget Mick Lombardo announced his premier stallion would be set for the cup, ending any doubt. In a Free For All in the week leading up to the WA Pacing Cup, Pocket Watch finished fifth. Fitpatrick explained that the horse was short of full fitness. In the main event a week later, Pocket Watch started from barrier eight, in the 2,536 m classic and was restrained early. Fitzpatrick was unable to obtain a clear run at a crucial stage as he was trapped on the inside by Garry Hall Junior's drive Franco Amon. Pocket Watch went to the line a hard-held forth as the race was taken out by Vanlo Yorker, who only a few months ago was running around as a $5000 claimer.

On 1 May 2008, began his campaign to become only the second horse to win all three age groups of the Vicbred Super Series. Pocket Watch started his campaign with an easy win in a heat of the Vicbred Super Series at Ballarat but was defeated by Melpark Major. Pocket Watch finished fourth in the high class Victorian Four and Five Year Old Championship to Smoken Up, and second to the same horse in the inaugural Len Smith Mile, a Group 1 free-for-all held over a mile on the new 1400 m track at Menangle Park.

On 8 August 2008, Lombo Pocket Watch was one of two horses invited to contest the premier four-year-old race of Australia, held at Harold Park in New South Wales, 2008 Courage Under Fire Chariots of Fire along with Vicbred Super Series Champion Melpark Major. In the lead up to the contest, he won two country free-for-all's at Menangle and Newcastle, the latter in 1:55.5, complete with a 26.0 second final quarter.

In a final lead up race, Lombo Pocket Watch was defeated at Harold Park by Make Me Smile. In the final Pocket Watch was beaten in a photo finish by New Zealand import Ebony Gem, officially the margin was 0.5 m, in a mile rate of 1:57.4 for the 2,160 m race.

== Five-year-old season (2008–2009) ==
Lombo Pocket Watch returned to the track with three wins during June, followed by a second in the 4 & 5 Year-Old Championship at Albion Park in Brisbane. Injury prevented him from continuing his campaign in Brisbane.

== Six-year-old season (2009–2010) ==
Lombo Pocket Watch's first run at six was a second at Harold Park in late September. He then ran in the Gold Coast Cup on 2 October, where he ran eighth behind Blacks A Fake after being three-wide without cover for the last lap. He then ran in Gr.1 Queensland Pacing Championship on 9 October, again at Gold Coast, in which he finished a luckless seventh.

== Stud career ==
Lombo Pocket Watch stood the 2008-2009 breeding season at owner Mick Lombardo's Concorde Park, Congupna, near Shepparton in Victoria. He stood for a fee of $3,300. However, a disappointing response to his stud career led to him being brought back into training.
