= Captain Joy =

Australian Standardbred racehorse

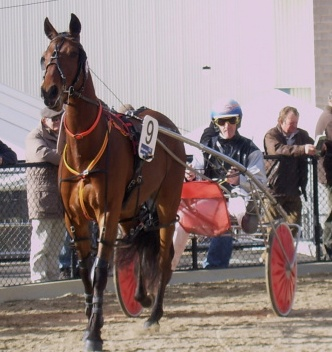
- Captain Joy at Menangle
- Breed: Standardbred
- Discipline: Pacing
- Sire: Mach Three
- Grandsire: Matts Scooter
- Dam: Lady Joy
- Maternal grandsire: Talk About Class
- Sex: Gelding
- Foaled: 20 October 2005
- Country: Australia
- Color: Bay
- Breeder: Marie Ross
- Owner: Marie Ross
- Trainer: Susan Hunter

Earnings
- $1,000,291

Major wins
- 2008 G1 Australasian Breeders Crown; 2008 G1 NSW Breeders Challenge (2c&g); 2009 G1 NSW Derby; 2009 G1 Victoria Derby; 2009 G1 Queensland Derby; 2009 G1 NSW Breeders Challenge (3c&g); 2010 G3 Queensland 4&5YO Championship; 2011 Listed Stawell Cup; 2012 G3 Media Cup; 2012 G3 Golden Mile

Other awards
- 2008 Australian 2YO C&G Pacer of the Year; 2008 NSW 2YO Pacer of the Year; 2009 Australian 3YO C&G Pacer of the Year; 2009 Australian 3YO Pacer of the Year; 2009 NSW 3YO Pacer of the Year; 2009 NSW Horse of the Year
- Last updated on: 28 March 2013.

Captain Joy is a Standardbred pacing racehorse whose wins include 6 Group 1 victories including three Derbies, 13 consecutive wins as a 2 and 3 year old, and a total of 26 wins through to the end of his 6 year old season.

He is a bay gelding who was foaled in New South Wales, Australia on the 20 October 2005 and sired by Mach Three. His dam Lady Joy was by Talk About Class. Mach Three, 1:49, earned $2,376,700 and sired several other good horses including Auckland Reactor and Somebeachsomewhere. Lady Joy won 13 races and $81,169 in a brief career of just 24 starts. Beyond Captain Joy she has also produced Another Joy (9 wins $103,319), Lightning Joy (a trotter, 11 wins $103,375) and Master Joy (12 wins $137,270). Her feats were recognised in 2009 when she was awarded the Australian Broodmare of the Year title.

== Racing record ==
His racing career began as a two-year-old in May 2008 with his first two starts when he finished mid field in races at Harold Park Paceway in Sydney. He then travelled to Queensland to compete in the Kevin Seymour series. After a win in his heat he finished second in the G1 final. He returned to Sydney and recorded four successive wins including the G1 NSW Breeders Challenge. During this race, Captain Joy raced three wide for most of the race and broke the Australasian record for two-year-olds over the distance of one mile when he rated 1.54.8. Shortly after that, Captain Joy travelled to Victoria for the Australasian Breeders Crown in August 2008. He won the race, which was marred by a spectacular fall which knocked out four horses on the final bend. He was awarded the title of 2008 Australian 2YO C&G Pacer of the Year and NSW 2YO of the Year.

=== At three years ===
He commenced his three-year-old season at Harold Park in late November 2008 with a win in the Listed Chokin Championship on Miracle Mile Pace night. His next start saw him set his season’s best time of 1:54.0 in a C0 race at Menangle Park.

Over the next few months he travelled the eastern seaboard of Australia in pursuit of the Victorian, Queensland and NSW Derbies. He won all three comfortably. The Queensland Derby was notable as he broke the all comers track record only to have it broken later in the night by Mr Feelgood in the Inter Dominion Grand Final. Towards the end of the season he won the three-year-old version of the NSW Breeders Challenge before heading to Victoria for the Australasian Breeders Crown. This resulted in his only loss for the season when he took sixth. During the 2009 season he had 13 starts for 12 wins and $382,576 1:54.0MS. Captain Joy was awarded the 2009 Australian 3YO C&G Pacer of the Year, 2009 Australian 3YO Pacer of the Year, NSW 3YO Pacer of the Year and NSW Horse of the Year.

=== At four years ===
As a four-year-old Captain Joy had just 10 starts but these races involved travel to Western Australia, Victoria, New South Wales, Queensland and Auckland, New Zealand. He placed multiple times in Group races before he was successful for the only time when he dead-heated for first in Group 3 Four & Five YO Championship in Brisbane with Rohan Home.

=== At five years ===
He was competitive in the Inter Dominion Championships in Auckland but the highlight so far was probably a Metropolitan class race at Menangle when he ran one of the fastest times ever in Australasia when he recorded a time of 1:51.6. This was just one week after finishing fourth to Smoken Up in the first race to go faster than 1.50 in the Southern Hemisphere.

=== At six years ===
He won the Listed Stawell Cup in December before finishing 3rd in the Group 2 Bendigo Cup. Some mixed results followed before he returned to Menangle and really hit his straps. Four wins followed including the Group 3 Media Cup and Group 3 Golden Mile where he beat the likes of Sir Lincoln, Terrorway and Mr Feelgood in a blistering time of 1.51.4. In his next start he was beaten an eyelash by Smoken Up in the Group 1 Len Smith Mile. A couple of placings behind Make Mine Cullen closed out the season for him.

=== At seven years ===
Captain Joy entered his seven-year-old season with much anticipation following great preparation. The major Victorian Cups followed by the Interdominions in Sydney were his initial goals. He headed up to Queensland with the Group 1 Queensland Pacing Championships in mind. He finished 3rd in this race behind Washakie. Making his way back to Victoria he suffered a minor leg injury which hasn't ruined his season but did rule him out until after the Interdominions. He should return to racing in April/May 2013.

== See also ==
- Glossary of Australian and New Zealand punting
- Harness racing in Australia
- Harness racing in New Zealand
