= Drottning Silvias Pokal =

- Class: Group One International
- Location: Åby Racetrack, Mölndal, Sweden
- Inaugurated: 1983
- Race type: Harness race for standardbred trotters

Race information
- Distance: 2,140 meters (1.33 mile)
- Track: Left-handed 1,000 meter track (0.62 mile)
- Qualification: Qualifying races. 4-year-old mares
- Purse: ≈US$273,000

Drottning Silvias Pokal (literally: Queen Silvia's Trophy) is an annual international Group One harness event for trotters. It is held at Åby Racetrack in Mölndal, 10 km south of Gothenburg, Sweden. It is a stakes race for 4-year-old mares. The purse in the 2009 final was ≈US$273,000 (€200,000), of which the winner Mystic Lady U.S. won half.

== Racing conditions ==
Drottning Silvia's Pokal has since the start in 1983 been raced over 2,140 meters (1.33 mile). Auto start (motorized gate) has been used every year, with the exception of 1988, when the race was started using volt start.

The final of the event is preceded by a number of elimination races, taking place approximately ten days before the final. Through the years, the number of elimination heats has been between two and six.

== The 2009 Drottning Silvias Pokal ==
The four elimination heats of the 2009 event took place on April 30, 14 days before the final. Winners of these heats were Annicka, Mystical Ann, Mystic Lady U.S. and Vanessa du Ling. In the final Mystical Ann, Annicka and Vanessa du Ling was first, second and third betting favourites, respectively. Qualification winner Mystic Lady U.S. was one of the outsiders.

=== The starting list ===
1. Mystical Ann - Åke Svanstedt
2. Annicka - Jörgen Westholm
3. Vanessa du Ling - Johnny Takter (Timo Nurmos)
4. Mystic Lady U.S. - Robert Bergh (Åke Svanstedt)
5. Miss Sixty - Olle Goop
6. Lily Kronos - Lutfi Kolgjini
7. Queen of Rock - Torbjörn Jansson (Jörgen Axén)
8. Victoria Island - Thomas Uhrberg (Lutfi Kolgjini)
9. Caddie Dream - Erik Adielsson (Stig H. Johansson)
10. Calamara Donna - Örjan Kihlström (Roger Walmann)
11. Tiffany Brodda - Per Lennartsson (Stig H. Johansson)
12. Looking Flashy - Peter Untersteiner

(Trainer, if other than driver, in parentheses)

=== The race ===
Mystical Ann was able to keep the lead in the start. Third favourite Vanessa du Ling broke stride almost instantly and could not repair the damage. When Annicka attacked with 1,200 meters to go, leading driver Åke Svanstedt handed over the front position to Annicka and Jörgen Westholm. Behind Mystical Ann, as third on the rail, was Mystic Lady U.S., followed by Calamara Donna and Tiffany Brodda. On the outside, Lily Kronos relieved Miss Sixty as parker with one lap (1,000 meters) to go. Queen of Rock raced in third over, with Caddie Dream behind. The latter attacked in the final lap, and eventually finished fourth. Down the stretch, the front runners appeared to be tired and, using the double open stretch, Mystic Lady U.S. and Calamara Donna could claim first and second place. Third was Tiffany Brodda, who also finished fast on the inside. Favourite Mystical Ann came in fifth.

The American-born filly Mystic Lady U.S., who was sired by Andover Hall and out of Astraea Hanover, is trained by Åke Svanstedt. Mystic Lady U.S. won by a neck in 1:58.3f (mile rate)/1:13.7 (km rate). She is the biggest outsider to win in the history of the event.

== Past winners ==
=== Drivers with most wins ===
- 5 - Johnny Takter
- 3 - Olle Goop
- 3 - Örjan Kihlström
- 2 - Erik Adielsson
- 2 - Robert Bergh
- 2 - Stig H. Johansson
- 2 - Bo Näslund
- 2 - Åke Svanstedt

=== Trainers with most wins ===
- 3 - Petri Puro
- 3 - Åke Svanstedt
- 3 - Olle Goop
- 3 - Stig H. Johansson
- 2 - Björn Larsson
- 2 - Bo Näslund
- 2 - Roger Walmann

=== Sires with at least two winning offsprings ===
- 3 - Quick Pay (Kristina Palema, Lass Dame, Sacrifice)
- 2 - Pine Chip (Rae Boko, Lotuschic)

=== Winner with lowest odds ===
- Winning odds: 1.18 - Ina Scot (1993)

=== Winner with highest odds ===
- Winning odds: 32.63 - Mystic Lady U.S. (2009)

=== Fastest winners ===
==== Auto start ====
- 1:12.4 (km rate) - Gisela Ås (2013)

==== Volt start ====
- 1:17.0 (km rate) - Gina Roy (1988)

=== All winners of Drottning Silvias Pokal ===
Year	Horse	Driver	Trainer	Odds of winner	Winning time (km rate)
2026	Pure Athena	Carl Johan Jepson	Fredrik Wallin	2.97	1:11.8
2025	Panthere D'Inverne	André Eklundh	André Eklundh	21.08	1:12.0
2024	Karaboudjan	Erik Adielsson	Adrian Kolgjini	3.23	1:12.5
2023	Joviality	Erik Adielsson	Sabine Kagebrant	1.42	1:12.4
2022	Chebba Mil	Robin Bakker	Paul J. Hagoort	4.16	1:11.7
2021	Fifty Cent Piece	Robert Bergh	Robert Bergh	4.32	1:12.6
2020	Diana Zet	Örjan Kihlström	Daniel Redén	8.21	1:12.6
2019	Activated	Carl Johan Jepson	Fredrik Wallin	62.44	1:11.6
2018	Dibaba	Örjan Kihlström	Roger Walmann	1.31	1:11.4
2017	Cash Crowe	Johnny Takter	Petri Puro	2.14	1:12.7
2016	Princess Face	Björn Goop	Lutfi Kolgjini	3.34	1:13.1
2015	Ruby Trap	Johnny Takter	Stefan Melander	2.67	1:13.4
2014	Backfire	Johnny Takter	Tomas Malmqvist	11.12	1:12.6
2013	Gisela Ås	Åke Svanstedt	Åke Svanstedt	4.80	1:12.4
2012	Love N Hate	Åke Svanstedt	Åke Svanstedt	2.19	1:14.2
2011	Tamla Celeber	Örjan Kihlström	Roger Walmann	1.29	1:13.0
2010	Viola Silas	Fredrik Persson	Fredrik Persson	1.34	1:12.9
2009	Mystic Lady U.S.	Robert Bergh	Åke Svanstedt	32.63	1:13.7
2008	Lie Detector	Örjan Kihlström	Stefan Hultman	5.43	1:13.6
2007	Birminghim	Johnny Takter	Harald Lunde	6.20	1:13.6
2006	Lotuschic	Erik Adielsson	Stig H. Johansson	4.06	1:14.5
2005	Fama Currit	Peter Ingves	Petri Puro	3.36	1:14.6
2004	Giant Diablo	Örjan Kihlström	Roger Walmann	1.71	1:15.6
2003	Rae Boko	Jorma Kontio	Markku Nieminen	1.94	1:15.1
2002	Blues Office	Johnny Takter	Petri Puro	1.94	1:16.2
2001	Hilda Zonett	Robert Bergh	Robert Bergh	1.91	1:15.0
2000	Sweet As Candy	Erik Adielsson	Lars-Eric Magnusson	6.60	1:15.3
1999	Cindy Bob	Mats Karlsson	Hans Karlsson	13.56	1:16.3
1998	Simb Capi	Per Lennartsson	Lennart Wikström	1.54	1:16.0
1997	Arnies Super Girl	Dick S. Jansson	Håkan Lindqvist	5.00	1:15.1
1996	Sacrifice	Olle Goop	Olle Goop	1.45	1:16.6
1995	Itaka Sund	Fredrik B. Larsson	Björn Larsson	2.77	1:16.7
1994	Serena	Christer Nylander	Christer Nylander	5.39	1:15.2
1993	Ina Scot	Kjell P. Dahlström	Kjell P. Dahlström	1.18	1:14.9
1992	Iata Käll	Jim Frick	Tommy Hanné	7.09	1:16.6
1991	Bowls Lady	Stig H. Johansson	Stig H. Johansson	1.61	1:17.2
1990	Drottning Sund	Björn Larsson	Björn Larsson	5.59	1:15.3
1989	Viva Mon	Åke Lindblom	Åke Lindblom	7.40	1:16.5
1988	Gina Roy	Stig H. Johansson	Stig H. Johansson	2.48	1:17.0
1987	Lass Dame	Bo Näslund	Bo Näslund	5.33	1:18.0
1986	Intact	Olle Goop	Olle Goop	2.72	1:17.4
1985	Kristina Palema	Bo Näslund	Bo Näslund	2.05	1:15.9
1984	Marina W.	Olle Goop	Olle Goop	2.70	1:16.3
1983	Sussi Håleryd	Ulf Nordin	Ulf Nordin	5.43	1:16.4

== See also ==
- List of Scandinavian harness horse races
