= Koala King =

Australian Standardbred racehorse

- Breed: Standardbred
- Discipline: Pacing
- Sire: Koala Frost
- Grandsire: Raider Frost
- Dam: Tawain
- Maternal grandsire: U Scott
- Sex: Stallion
- Foaled: 1972
- Country: Australia
- Color: Bay
- Breeder: G. Archer & D. Flynn, NSW
- Owner: Mr & Mrs Ray Wisbey
- Trainer: Ray Wisbey

Earnings
- $680,110

Major wins
- Group one wins: 1981 A G Hunter Cup; 1980 Inter Dominion Pacing Championship; 1979, 1980 Qld Sir Clive Uhr Championship; 1978, 1979, 1980 Vic Winfield Cup; 1980 Vic Winfield Gold Cup

Awards
- 1979 Australasian Pacers Grand Circuit Champion; 1979 Australian 4YO+ Pacer of the Year

Other awards
- 1979 Stake Earner of the Year (Pacers)
- Last updated on: 20 August 2011.

Koala King was a former champion Australian Standardbred pacing horse of the 1970s and 80s who won a host of Australasian Pacers Grand Circuit and feature races including the 1980 Inter Dominion Pacing Championship at Harold Park Paceway and the 1981 A G Hunter Cup. He won a record 40 races at the old Harold Park Paceway prior to its closure. Koala King won a total of seventy eight races.

He was a bay colt foaled in 1972 that was sired by Koala Frost from Tawain by U Scott (USA) from Jacinta by Protector from Cavatina by Arion Axworthy (USA) from Dilworth by Travis Axworthy (USA) from Muriel Dillon by Harold Dillon (USA) from Muriel Madison (USA) by James Madison from Dolly by Memo from Marguerite by Speculation. The future champion was purchased from the sales in the early 1970s for the modest sum of $1,300.

== Racing record ==
Koala King was owned and trained by a South Coast trainer Ray Wisbey and his wife. Koala King was driven in the early part of his career by Kevin Robinson before Brian Hancock took the reins for many of his feature race wins.

On 28 July 1978 at Harold Park Koala King, the race favourite, was in the centre of major error when his driver Kevin Robinson mistook the laps in the main event. Robinson thought there was another lap to the finish when the field was in fact already at the finish. The crowd jeered the driver, but the stewards said it was an honest mistake but they suspended Robinson for six months.

Koala King contested the national hero and sentimental favourite Paleface Adios in the 39th Inter Dominion held in 1980 at Sydney. Paleface Adios was already a winner of over 100 races and eight Inter Dominion heats, but was denied victory in the championship final by a brilliant Koala King.

During his racing career Koala King competed and defeated some of the best pacers ever in Gammalite, Pure Steel and Michael Frost (also a son of Koala Frost) Koala King's total race earnings were $680,110.

== Stud record ==
The most notable of Koala King's progeny were:

- Brunei Achilles, won $23,450
- Copper Regent 1:58.8 $88,749
- Jilliby Diamond 1987 F 2:07.7 $5,852; dam of Jilliby Spirit (won $415,382)
- Koala Sunrise (US)$308,396
- Palais Queen $6,328

== See also ==
- Harness racing in Australia
