= Pure Steel =

Australian Standardbred racehorse

- Breed: Standardbred
- Sire: Toledo Hanover (USA)
- Grandsire: Adios
- Dam: Pure Band
- Maternal grandsire: Hundred Proof (USA)
- Sex: Stallion
- Foaled: 1 September 1971
- Died: July 1996
- Country: Australia
- Colour: Bay
- Breeder: L. Gordon
- Owner: Russell Roberts
- Trainer: 1. Fred Kersley; 2. Phil Coulson

Record
- 127: 68-29-8

Earnings
- A$915,302

Major wins
- 1975 Western Australia Pacing Derby; 1977, 1978 & 1980 A G Hunter Cup; 1978 Miracle Mile Pace; 1977, 1978, 1979 & 1980 Western Australian Pacing Cup; 1980 Fremantle Cup

Awards
- 1978 & 1980 Australian Aged Pacer of the Year; 1980 Australian Harness Horse of the Year; 1979/80 Australian Grand Circuit Champion

Honours
- Western Australian Racing Industry Hall of Fame; Best mile rate 1:56.9 TT
- Last updated on: 26 January 2016.

Pure Steel is the only pacer to win the A G Hunter Cup, a race over 3,050 metres and the richest handicap race for pacers in the world, three times, in 1977, 1978, and 1980. He was the first Standardbred horse to win A$500,000 in Australia. Pure Steel also won the WA Benson & Hedges Cup four times. Affectionately known as Steelo or the "Tungsten Terror", he raced from 1974 until 1983 and won just under $1 million, at a time when competition was strong, with the great horses Paleface Adios and Hondo Grattan as competitors.

== Background ==
Pure Steel was an Australian bred Standardbred Harness racing horse foaled in 1971. Pure Steel was by Toledo Hanover (USA), his dam Pure Band was by Hundred Proof (USA)from the good mare, Bandbox, winner of the 1947 Inter Dominion. Pure Steel was sold at the Sydney yearling sales for A$2,400.

== Racing record ==
During his career, Pure Steel won many of Australia's major harness races. He did not win the Inter Dominion, but finished second to Carclew in 1976 and third to Koala King in 1980.

After racing only twice as a two-year-old, Pure Steel was prepared for the Western Australian Sires Produce and Western Australian Derby in the 1974/5 season. After finishing second in the Sires Produce, his win in the derby was his first feature race win.

As a four-year-old he travelled outside of his home state for the first time when he headed to Adelaide for the 1976 Inter Dominion. After finishing fourth, first and second in his heats, Pure Steel was one of the favourites for the final. The defeat by Carclew lead to a split between owner Russell Roberts and trainer Fred Kersley.

Pure Steel won 10 of his 22 starts as a five-year-old during the 1976/7 season and was a regular competitor on the inaugural Grand Circuit. After winning the Kilmore Cup, Pure Steel contested the first ever Australian Pacing Championship, finishing second to Markovina. The finish to the race was somewhat controversial as the driver of the winner, Brian Gath, was suspended for an incident during the race but a protest was not successful. After the first of his four Western Australian Pacing Cup wins Pure Steel tackled the A G Hunter Cup for the first time. After two defeats in lead up races at Moonee Valley by Markovina, Pure Steel gained his first Hunter Cup win defeating Paleface Adios and Royal Force. Following a sixth and last place in the Miracle Mile Pace, and a win in the BP Marathon, Pure Steel tried to make up for his second place in the 1976 Interdominion to Carclew at Albion Park in Brisbane. However he finished unplaced in the final.

The 1977–78 season cemented Pure Steel's name amongst the great horses of Australian harness racing. He began the season by winning the Whirlwind Sprint at Moonee Valley in a quick 1:58.5, finished second in the Winfield Cup, also at Moonee Valley, and second in the Kilmore Cup. He then travelled to Adelaide for the Australian Pacing Championship where he won both his heats but could only finish third behind new star Rip Van Winkle in the final. In January Pure Steel won the Western Australian Pacing Cup for the second consecutive year, this time breaking the race record. The following month he travelled to Melbourne for the Hunter Cup and was successful in recording a remarkable staying performance. Pure Steel sat without cover outside of leader Rip Van Winkle for most of the 2800m but won convincingly in track record time. 'The gutsiest thing on four legs' said driver Ted Demmler. The race is still regarded by many as one of the greatest ever run at Moonee Valley

The 1978 Interdominion was the first Interdominion series entirely run from behind the mobile barrier. Pure Steel was strongly favoured at 6/4 for the final before the series began but contracted a virus and did not make the final. After winning the consolation race he headed to Sydney and defeated Paleface Adios in the Miracle Mile. By the end of the season he was leading Australian stakeswinner for the second straight year and the 1977/8 Grand Circuit Champion.

Pure Steel began 1978/9 with a second to Koala King in the Winfield Cup and a third from a 35m handicap in the Kilmore Cup. But after a record third win in the Western Australian Pacing Cup defeating Koala King, and a win over local star Nevada Smoke in the South Australian Pacing Cup, he missed the remainder of the big races that season due to injury. Despite the injury he still passed Paleface Adios to become Australian harness racings leading stakeswinner.

Only having a limited preparation, he contested the 1980 Western Australian Pacing Cup series and was beaten by new rival Satinover in the first round of heats. It was a 17th consecutive win for Satinover, but after he was injured Pure Steel won the WA Cup final for a record fourth time becoming the leading stakeswinner in Australian racing passing the thoroughbred Family of Man and then won the Fremantle Cup from the 35m backmark. Heading east, Pure Steel won a record third Hunter Cup outstaying Koala King who'd had an easier run, and finished second behind New Zealander Locarno in the Miracle Mile. After three unsuccessful Interdominion campaigns, wins in all three rounds of heats indicated that 1980 at Harold Park might be his year. It was not to be, however, with a 15m handicap combined with rivals the quality of winner Koala King and runner-up Locarno too difficult to overcome.

On the night of 2 May 1980 Pure Steel took part in one of the most anticipated events in Perth harness racing history, a $50,000 match race with Satinover. Satinover's winning streak had reached 19 and he had defeated Pure Steel at their only meeting. But this time the result was very different with Pure Steel parking outside Satinover for much of the race but still winning convincingly. There was a crowd of nearly 20,000 in attendance and sufficient interest in the race for television coverage. He was subsequently voted Australian Harness Horse of the Year.

The 1980/1 season began with Pure Steel finishing second in the Winfield Cup for the third time and second off a 30m handicap in the Kilmore Cup. He was then injured during the Australian Pacing Championship in Melbourne. Returning to racing in time for the 1981 Interdominion in Hobart, Pure Steel finished fourth to new sensation San Simeon in the final. After overcoming a serious illness in August 1981 Pure Steel defeated Satinover at Gloucester Park in Perth before breaking that horse's state mile record with a 1:56.9 time trial. However age was catching up with him and he failed to make the WA Pacing Cup final, and the final of the Interdominion even though it was at home in Perth in 1982. After the 1982 series he was retired but then was brought out of retirement for one run which was a fourth place in the 1983 BOTRA Cup before being retired again.

Pure Steel also won the 1981 Stratton Cup, 1982 FTC Members Mile and 1980 Mount Eden Sprint. All are important races on the Perth calendar.

In 1982 the Australian Trotting Council voted him best postwar standardbred and he was voted one of Australia's best ever pacers by the Harness Racer, Australian Standardbred and Harness Racing International magazines.

He died in 1996 and buried in a paddock at his owner's property at West Swan.

== Major honours ==
- 1975 Western Australian Derby
- 1976 Kilmore Cup
- 1977 Vic Marathon Stakes
- 1977, 1978 & 1980 A G Hunter Cup
- 1977, 1978, 1979 & 1980 Western Australian Pacing Cup
- 1978 Miracle Mile Pace
- 1980 Fremantle Cup
- 1980 Australian Harness Horse of the Year
- 1979/80 Australasian Pacers Grand Circuit Champion
