= Hondo Grattan =

Australian Standardbred racehorse

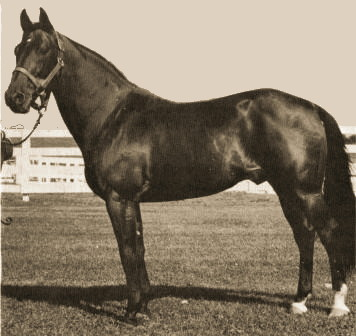
- Adios (USA), the grandsire of Hondo Grattan.
- Breed: Standardbred
- Sire: Hondo Hanover
- Grandsire: Adios
- Dam: Lola Grattan
- Maternal grandsire: Loreto
- Sex: Stallion
- Foaled: 1 September 1968
- Country: Australia
- Colour: Brown
- Breeder: B & R Webb
- Owner: Bill and Bob Webb
- Trainer: A.D. "Tony" Turnbull

Record
- 116: 58-16-17

Earnings
- A$215,402

Major wins
- 1971 NSW Sires Produce; 1973 Lord Mayor's Cup; 1973, 1974 Inter Dominion Pacing Championship; 1974 Miracle Mile Pace; 1975 Lord Mayor’s Cup

Awards
- 1973 & 1974 NSW Harness Horse of the Year

Honours
- Best mile rate, 1:59; Raced 1971-1976
- Last updated on: 22 August 2011.

Hondo Grattan was a Standardbred pacer from Bathurst, New South Wales known as the "Bathurst Bulldog". He won the Inter Dominion Pacing Championship in both 1973 and 1974, becoming the first horse to successfully defend an Inter Dominion title. Hondo Grattan was the first horse in Australia to win (AUD)$200,000 and also the first horse to win 21 races at Harold Park Paceway. He was a winner at a time of top competition, that included horses such as Pure Steel and Paleface Adios. He was inducted into the Inter Dominion Hall of Fame.

== Racing record ==
Throughout his career Hondo Grattan was trained by A.D. "Tony" Turnbull at The Lagoon, Bathurst, NSW who part-owned him with farmers Bill and Bob Webb.

Hondo Grattan made a winning racetrack debut on 24 May 1971 at Penrith however it was his only win in six starts as a two-year-old.

He began his three-year-old season by winning eight consecutive races before being defeated by Jason King at Harold Park on 26 November 1972. He then won a further eight consecutive races including the New South Wales Sires’ Produce, second in importance only to the New South Wales Derby. After defeating Adios Victor and Jason King in a derby heat in March, he was unplaced in the final to Bold Biami and fourth to Bold Biami in the Simpson Sprint. He won 17 of his 21 starts during the season.

Hondo Grattan finished fourth in the Australasian Four-year-old Championship at Harold Park and after an unsuccessful trip to Melbourne he contested the Australia Day Cup series in January 1973. After a win and an unlucky fifth in his heats he finished third in the final on 26 January to Bold Biami. Hondo Grattan also won the 1973 New South Wales Futurity.

The Inter Dominion was to be held in Sydney that year and it attracted an extremely strong field of contenders including defending champion Welcome Advice, New Zealand stars Robalan, Arapaho, Manaroa, Royal Ascot and Globe Bay, Victorian Reichman the runner-up in the 1972 Miracle Mile Pace, as well as New South Wales trained Just Too Good, Jason King and Australia Day Cup winner Bold Biami. The quantity and quality of horses contesting the series was such that six heats were held on each night, the only time this has happened. On the first night he beat Arapaho and Jason King before defeating Speedy Ben and Bold Biami to be the only pacer undefeated after two rounds of heats. The third round was postponed several days due to rain, but when they were held Hondo Grattan remained unbeaten. After drawing barrier two Hondo Grattan was favourite for the final in a strong field. Despite a tough run Hondo Grattan prevailed over Royal Ascot and Glamour Chief. After trainer-driver Turnbull was suspended he missed the Miracle Mile Pace. Hondo Grattan then won the Lord Mayors’ Cup following second and first place heat finishes. He did it the hard way defeating Nicotine Prince after making a slow start.

Early in the 1973/4 season Hondo Grattan contested the Spring Cup at Harold Park and finished second in both his heats off a 20-metre handicap before finishing third to Bold Jason in the final off the same mark. He then broke 2:00 for the first time with a 1:59.5 time trial at Bathurst. Heading to Melbourne for the Hunter Cup carnival, he was third to Monara and a winner defeating Amlin and Reichman before finishing fifth in the A G Hunter Cup. Hondo Grattan's next mission was to defend his Interdominion crown in Perth, Western Australia. He made a winning start by defeating New Zealander Hi Foyle on the first night but he was only eight on the second night of the carnival. In both those races he came from a 15m handicap. The third round of heats were run under free-for-all conditions but the ‘Bathurst Bulldog’ could finish no better than a dead-heat for fourth and was fortunate to make the final field. The 1974 Interdominion is best remembered for a crash at the beginning of the race that left only four winning chances. With many of his main rivals out of play Hondo Grattan held off the finishing challenge of Adios Victor with Bret Armagh third. Bret Armagh was later disqualified with Royal Gaze promoted to third. By winning the race he became the first horse to win consecutive Interdominions, and only the second horse to win the race twice. Coincidentally, Captain Sandy, the other two-time winner, also recorded his second win in Perth.

Returning to Sydney, Hondo Grattan won the Miracle Mile Pace in a career best 1:59 over Paleface Adios and Mitchell Victory becoming the first horse to win both the Miracle Mile Pace and Interdominion in the same year. His last major assignment was the Albion Park Ten Thousand in Brisbane where he was fifth in the final. He was the leading stakeswinner in Australian harness racing for the second consecutive season.

Hondo Grattan's first major engagement of the 1974/5 season was the Hunter Cup carnival in Melbourne where he was third to Gallagher before finishing third to Royal Gaze and Paleface Adios in the Cup itself. The Interdominion was held in Auckland, New Zealand that year and although a strong team of Australian pacers including Hondo Grattan, Paleface Adios, Just Too Good and Royal Gaze made the trip across the Tasman, they were no match for Young Quinn who was unbeaten during the series. Hondo Grattan performed creditably finishing fifth, third and second in his heats despite a 25m handicap. Turnbull was suspended for the final when ‘Hondo’ finished sixth to Young Quinn. It looked like a major race win would escape him that season, but he completed 1974/5 by winning the Lord Mayor's Cup from a handicap of 25m. During the season he became Australian harness racing's leading stakesearner.

The 1975/6 season was Hondo Grattan's last on the racetrack. His best performances during the season were a third to Paleface Adios and Don't Retreat in the Miracle Mile Pace and win over King Frost in the Hurricane Sprint.

== Retirement ==
Hondo Grattan was retired to stud after finishing third to King Frost on 17 April 1976. He was not a great success at stud but one of his best progeny was the consistent Mister Meggs who later raced in the USA.

Hondo Grattan died following a bout of colic at the age of 26 on 30 November 1994 in his yard at The Lagoon having remained at stud with Tony Turnbull after his retirement.

== Honours ==
He was twice voted NSW Harness Horse of the Year in 1973 and 1974, and had a song written about him called "Little Hondo", which was sung by racecaller Johnny Tapp.

== See also ==
- Harness racing in Australia
