= Australian Derby (harness) =

Australian horse racing event

The Australian Derby is a harness racing event held for three-year-old pacers which has been shared between many of Australia's premier tracks. It is currently held annually at Launceston in Tasmania. The 2007 version was won by Lombo Pocket Watch.

The Australian Derby differs from other Derbies in that it is not organised by a state-controlling body, but rather by the national body.

It is in a similar vein to the Australian Pacing Championship in that it is not a state-specific event.
