= Victoria Derby (harness) =

The Victoria Derby is Australia's oldest classic harness race, dating back to 1914 when it was contested on the old Richmond circuit.

The race has been won by some of Australia and New Zealand's greatest pacers including:

- Lazarus: Australian Harness Horse of the Year (2018)
- Leap To Fame: Australian Harness Horse of the Year (2023, 2024 & 2025)
- Lombo Pocket Watch: Australian Harness Horse of the Year (2006)
- Paleface Adios: Australian Harness Horse of the Year (1997)
- Westburn Grant: Australian Harness Horse of the Year (1989, 1991 & 1992)

In 2025 Ryan Sanderson, in his first Group 1 win, drove Fox Dan to win the Victoria Derby.

== Winners ==
Recent winners of the Victoria Derby are:

Year	Winner	Driver	Trainer	2nd	3rd	Ref.
2026	Dynamitedan	James Herbertson	Emma Stewart	Mount Barker Boy	Soho Charmer	
2025	Fox Dan	Ryan Sanderson	Emma Stewart	Captain Perfect	Its Confidential	
2024	Best Deal	Mark Pitt	Emma Stewart	Some American	Miki To Success	
2023	Petracca	Cameron Hart	Emma Stewart	Perfect Class	Captain Hammerhead	
2022	Leap To Fame	Grant Dixon	Grant Dixon	Ripp	Interest Free	
2021	Act Now	Jodi Quinlan	Emma Stewart	Blitzern	Longfellow	
2020	Line Up	Anthony Butt	Anthony Butt	Governor Jujon	Perfect Stride	

=== Past winners ===
- 2019 Muscle Factory
- 2018 Colt Thirty One
- 2017 Our Little General
- 2016 Lazarus
- 2015 Menin Gate
- 2014 Our Maxim
- 2013 Ohoka Punter
- 2012 Scandalman
- 2011 Sushi Sushi
- 2010 Courage To Rule
- 2009 Captain Joy
- 2008 Tanabi Bromac
- 2007 Lombo Pocket Watch
- 2006 Divisive
- 2005 Emmas Only
- 2004 The Sentry
- 2003 Bellas Boy
- 2002 Tricky Vic
- 2001 Rare Gem
- 2000 Stars And Stripes
- 1999 Courage Under Fire
- 1998 Holmes D G
- 1997 Lavros Star - Ricky May
- 1996 Sharp And Telford
- 1995 Blueagle
- 1994 Khans Thunder
- 1993 Golden Reign
- 1992 Lotsnlots
- 1991 Dark Paul
- 1990 Admiral Holliday
- 1989 Westburn Grant
- 1988 Another Bart
- 1987 Sir Lorian
- 1986 Smooth Falcon
- 1985 Bag Limit
- 1984 Area Code
- 1983 Man Of The Moment
- 1982 Garry's Advice
- 1981 Gundary Flyer
- 1980 Under A Cloud
- 1979 Rhett
- 1978 Brad Adios
- 1977 Sammy Karamea
- 1976 High Advice
- 1975 Little William
- 1974 Alphalite
- 1973 Paleface Adios
- 1972 Annastere
- 1971 Moon Reveller
- 1970 Welcome Advice
- 1969 National Gold
- 1968 Ascot King
- 1967 Kelly Kid
- 1966 Future Intangible
- 1965 Bon Adios
- 1964 Dale's Gift
- 1963 Tactile
- 1962 Future Raider
- 1961 Opal Chief
- 1960 Arabian
- 1959 Meadow Royal
- 1958 Smoko
- 1957 Shean Truis
- 1956 Argent
- 1955 Mighty Warrior
- 1954 Mineral Spring
- 1953 Rotarian
- 1952 Selwyn
- 1951 High Raider
- 1950 Acclaim
- 1949 Lawrenny
- 1948 General Dixie
- 1941 Bobby Linden
- 1940 Admirer
- 1939 Radiant Robert
- 1938 Radiant Walla
- 1937 The Gap
- 1936 Gentle Bobbie
- 1935 Dixie Globe
- 1934 Grand Harold
- 1933 Star Princess
- 1932 Connie Glo
- 1931 Con Derby
- 1930 Jean Pronto
- 1929 My Chum
- 1928 Robert Derby
- 1927 Lulureen
- 1926 Wilverley
- 1925 Torpedo Huon
- 1924 Auto Machine
- 1923 Vinmont Chimes
- 1917-22 No race held
- 1916 Princess Chimes
- 1915 Countess Chimes
- 1914 Lucap

== See also ==
- Victoria Cup
- Miracle Mile Pace
- A G Hunter Cup
- Inter Dominion Pacing Championship
- New Zealand Trotting Cup
- Queensland Pacing Championship
- Harness racing in Australia
- Harness racing in New Zealand
