= Harold Park Paceway =

Former trotting venue in Sydney, Australia

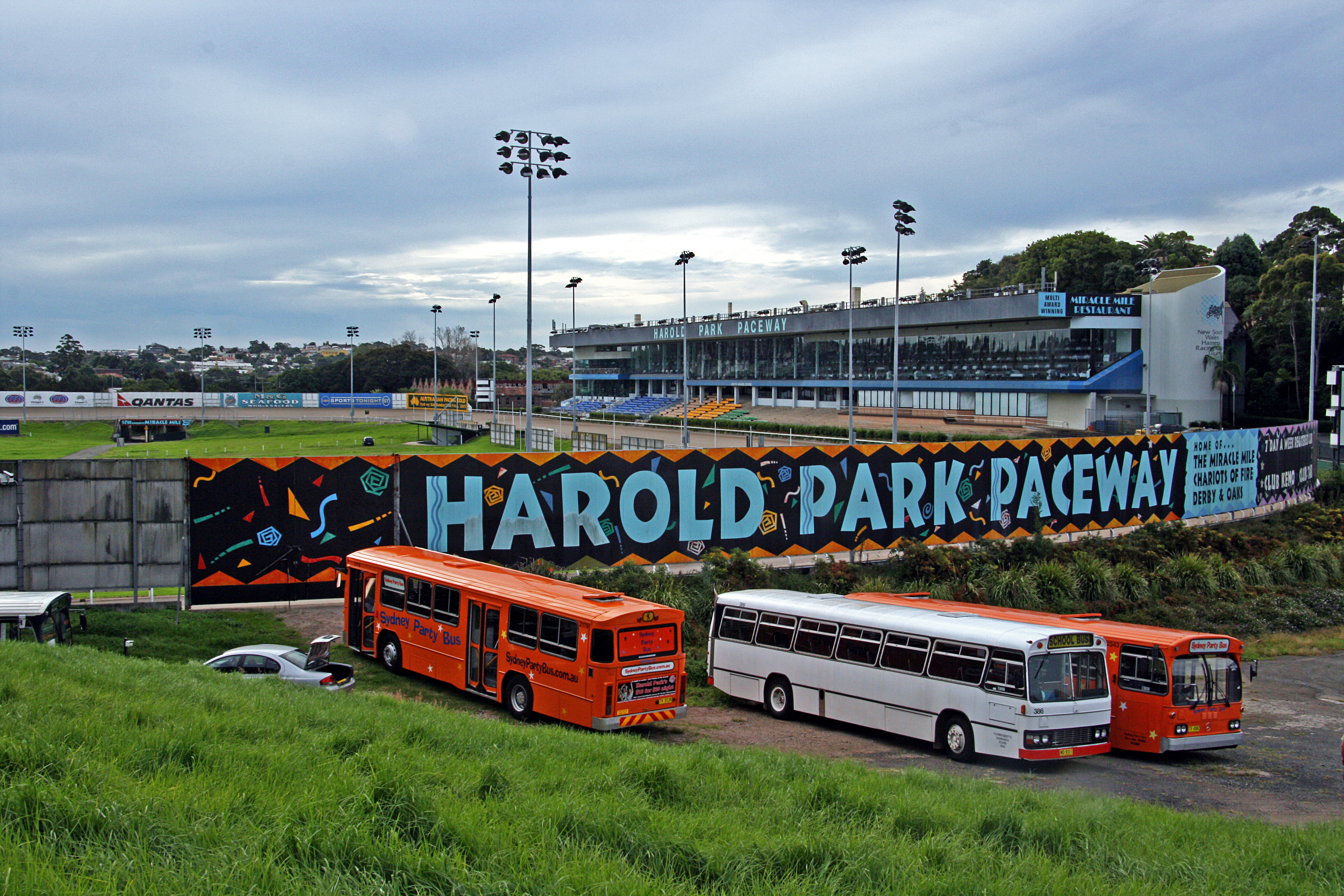
- Harold Park Paceway in April 2009
- Interactive map of Harold Park Paceway
- Location: Forest Lodge, Australia
- Coordinates: 33°52′42″S 151°10′42″E
- Owned by: Mirvac
- Date opened: 10 October 1902
- Date closed: 17 December 2010
- Course type: Harness Racing
- Notable races: Inter Dominion; Miracle Mile

Harold Park Paceway was a harness racing track in Forest Lodge, New South Wales, in use from 1890 to 2010. It was a half-mile track (804.5 metres) but was just 739 metres in circumference until some changes in its later years. Races at the track were run over distances of 1,760 m, 2,160 m, 2,565 m and occasionally 2,965 m. Before its configuration, events were run over one mile, 9 furlongs and 170 yards, 11 3/4 furlongs, 13 furlongs and 98 yards and 15 furlongs and 92 yards – these distances were all for standing starts. For mobile racing, the distances were one mile, 9 1/2 furlongs and 11 1/2 furlongs.

== History ==
Founded in 1890, the course was first known as Forest Lodge, and for the first meeting there were five events with total prize money of ninety-nine sovereigns.

Just prior to the turn of the 20th century, and before meetings commenced at Forest Lodge, trotting and pacing was confined primarily to match races between enthusiasts without any serious attempt at organisation. Following some preliminary discussions, thirty-three of the sport's supporters met on 4 June 1902 at the saddlery shop of J. McGrath, a well-known harness maker of the day. Those present at the meeting raised the sum of 19 pounds 17 shillings and 6 pence to launch the proposed club. The general contribution was 2/6 per person, while the maximum donation was 10 guineas by J.A. Buckland, owner of a famous horse called "Fritz."

The club was incorporated on 10 October 1902, with twenty-two members paying a subscription of two guineas, and the inaugural meeting was held on 19 November 1902. The course was leased from the Metropolitan Rugby Union. Following two meetings at Forest Lodge, racing moved to the Kensington Pony course until June 1904, before resuming at Forest Lodge, by then renamed Epping.

In 1911 the New South Wales Trotting Club was recognised as the controlling authority of harness racing in the state by the Colonial Secretary. The club retained that status until 1976, when control was transferred to the Trotting Authority of New South Wales. In 1911, the club purchased the course from the Metropolitan Rugby Union for 10,400 pounds.

On 21 March 1929, due to confusion of the name with the Sydney suburb, the track was renamed from Epping to Harold Park, after the imported trotter Childe Harold, one of the great progenitors of the stock of the early trotting days. The Kentucky-bred Childe Harold was imported from Glasgow, Scotland by Andrew Town of Richmond.

1 October 1949 marked the beginning of night racing, following legislation enacted with the support of all parties in the State Parliament. Harold Park, from that time, become known internationally as the mecca of Australian harness racing.

From May 1927 until December 1987, Harold Park also hosted Greyhound racing meetings. The first race meeting on 28 May 1927, was the first (track oval) race to be held in Australia.

In 1995 and 1996, Harold Park was reconstructed and expanded over the Johnstons Creek, enlarging the track to a half-mile track.

== Final of the Inter Dominion 1960 ==
A high-profile event took place on 13 February 1960, billed as "the stars racing under the stars", when the "mighty atom" Caduceus from New Zealand defeated Australia's Apmat in the final of the Inter Dominion in front of a world record crowd of 50,346. Over the previous two weeks, the best pacers in Australia and New Zealand had opposed each other in three series of heats.

Caduceus and Apmat had been identified as the best horses in the final field, and throughout the heats, a rivalry had emerged between the horses' drivers, Jack Litten of New Zealand on Caduceus, and local champion Bert Alley on Apmat.

The final was extremely well-attended, with spectators filling the inside greyhound circuit and the centre-course carpark, and those who were unable to see in the grandstand tore down timber and three-ply partitions in the main grandstand to get a better view. In the end Caduceus passed the post half a length ahead of Apmat. Alley lodged a protest against the result, but it was dismissed by the stewards, and Caduceus was declared the winner.

== Races ==
The Miracle Mile Pace was the signature race at the Glebe circuit from 1967 to 2008, originally conceived by former Harold Park Chief Executive Len Smith. Winners have included some of the most successful horses of harness racing, including Robin Dundee, Young Quinn, Hondo Grattan, Mount Eden, Halwes, Paleface Adios, Chokin, Westburn Grant, Village Kid, Christian Cullen and Smooth Satin. Paleface Adios contested the race for seven consecutive years from 1974 to 1980. The Harold Park race record was held by the New Zealand champion Iraklis. The last Miracle Mile run at Harold Park was won by Divisive on 28 November 2008. The Miracle Mile moved to the new Menangle Park Paceway in 2009.

The Inter Dominion was run at Harold Park on several occasions. Notable among the Inter Dominion pacing winners was Hondo Grattan who won the first of his two Inter-Dominions in 1973 with Tony Turnbull as driver. Brian Hancock won the race twice, in 1980 on Koala King and 1994 on Weona Warrior. 1988 saw Our Maestro give John Binskin his only Inter-Dominion win for the Bob Knight stable. In 1966 the Tasmanian Chamfer's Star made a clean sweep of the series for driver Brian Forrester and Bankstown trainer, Max Treuer. In 2002 Smooth Satin and trainer/driver Steve Turnbull added the race to his victories in the Miracle Mile, Ben Hur and Chariots of Fire.

Some of the winners of Inter Dominion Trotting Championship, the trotter's edition of the series at Harold Park, have included Hano Direct, Yamamoto, Diamond Field and Precocious.

Leading trainers and drivers at Harold Park Paceway at its peak included Donny McPherson, who had many wins there, Kevin Robinson, Kevin Newman, Jim Caffyn and Vic Frost.

=== 1952 Inter Dominion Racebook ===
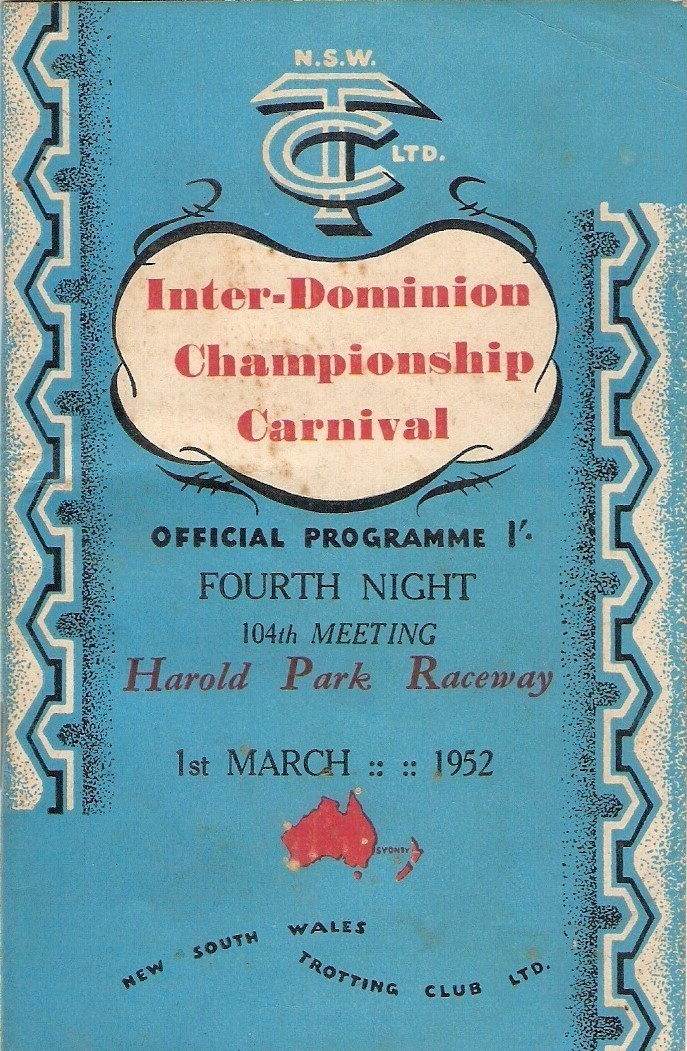
Front cover of the 1952 Harold Park Inter Dominion Final racebook.

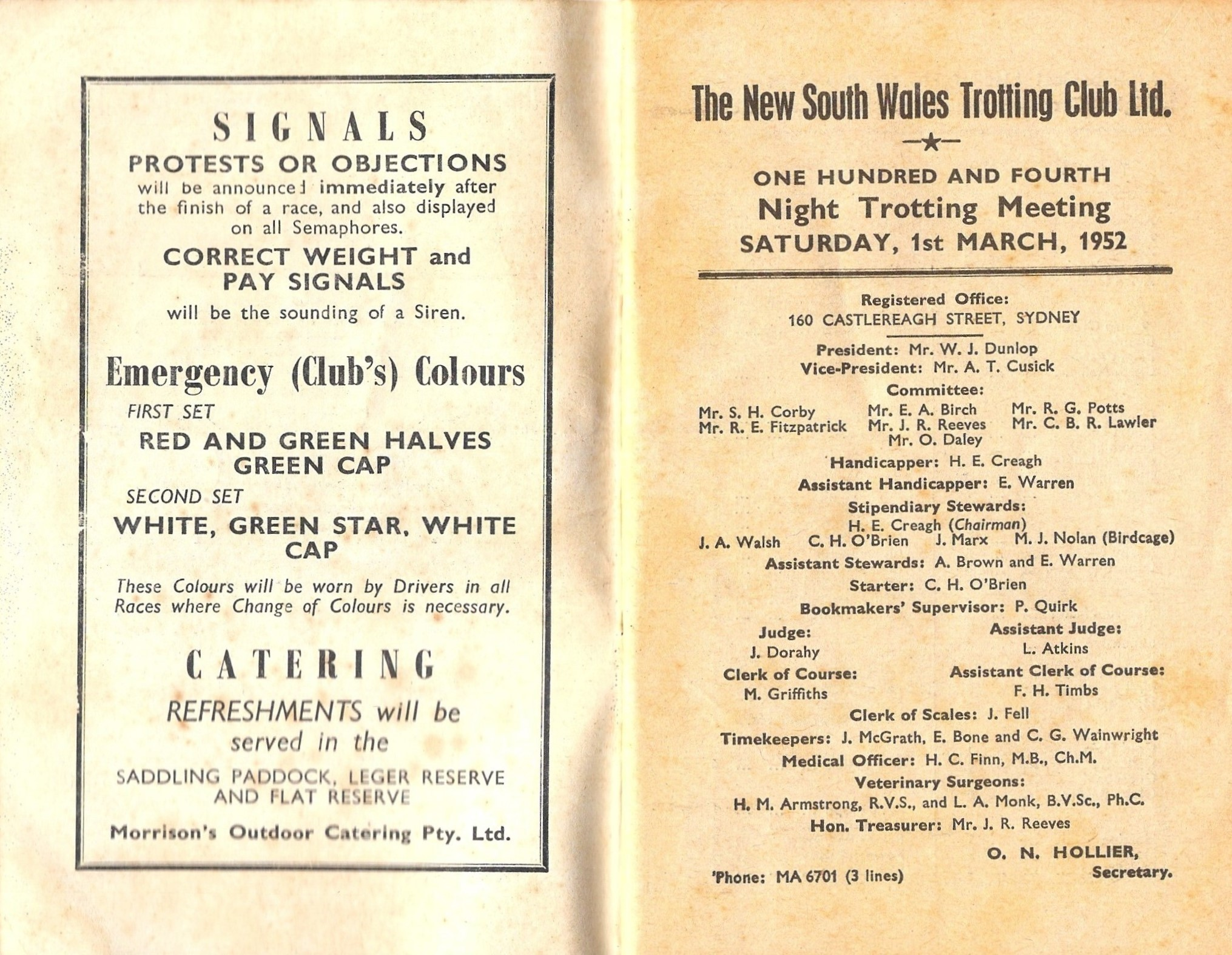
Inside cover showing race night officials.

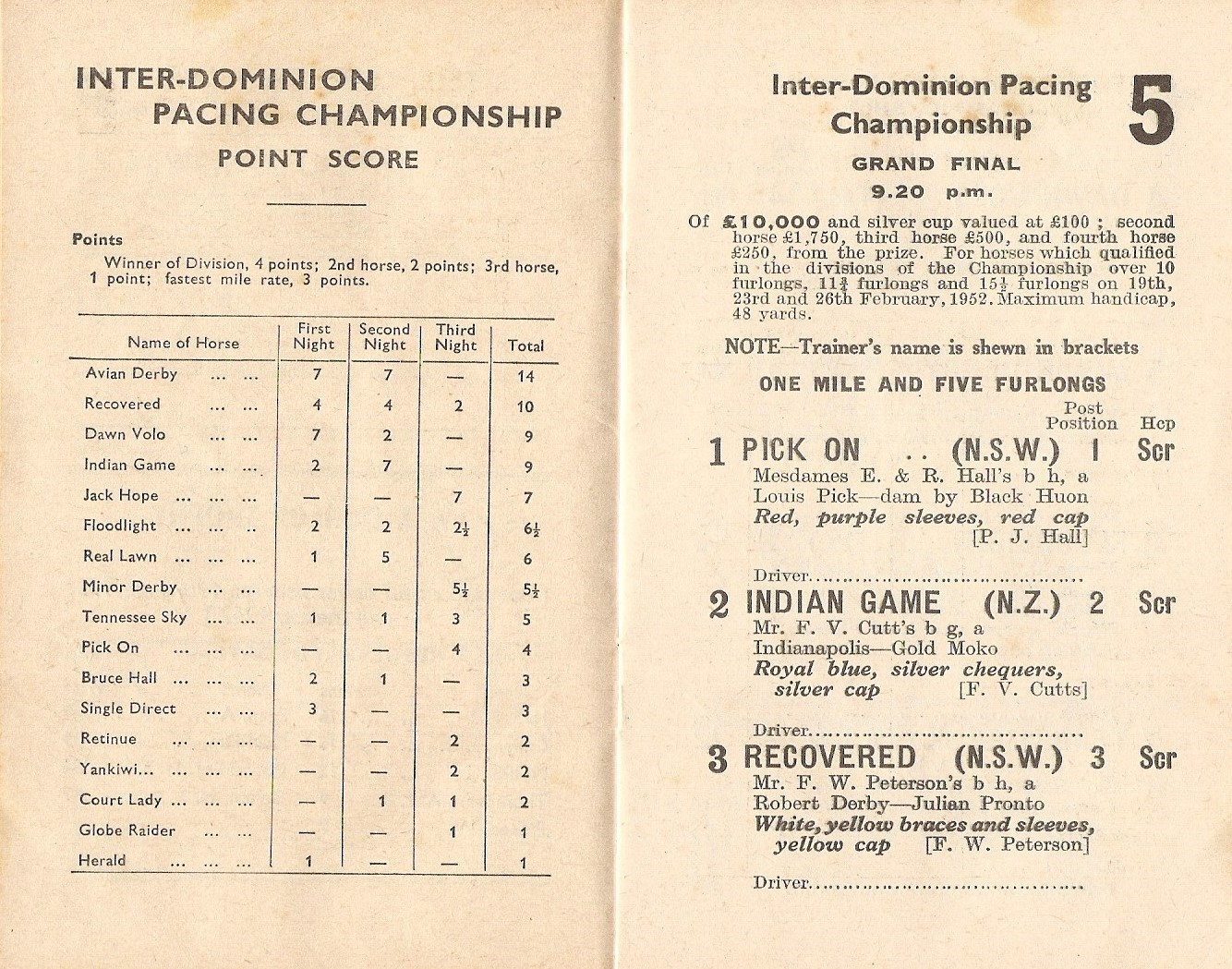
Racebook showing starters & conditions.

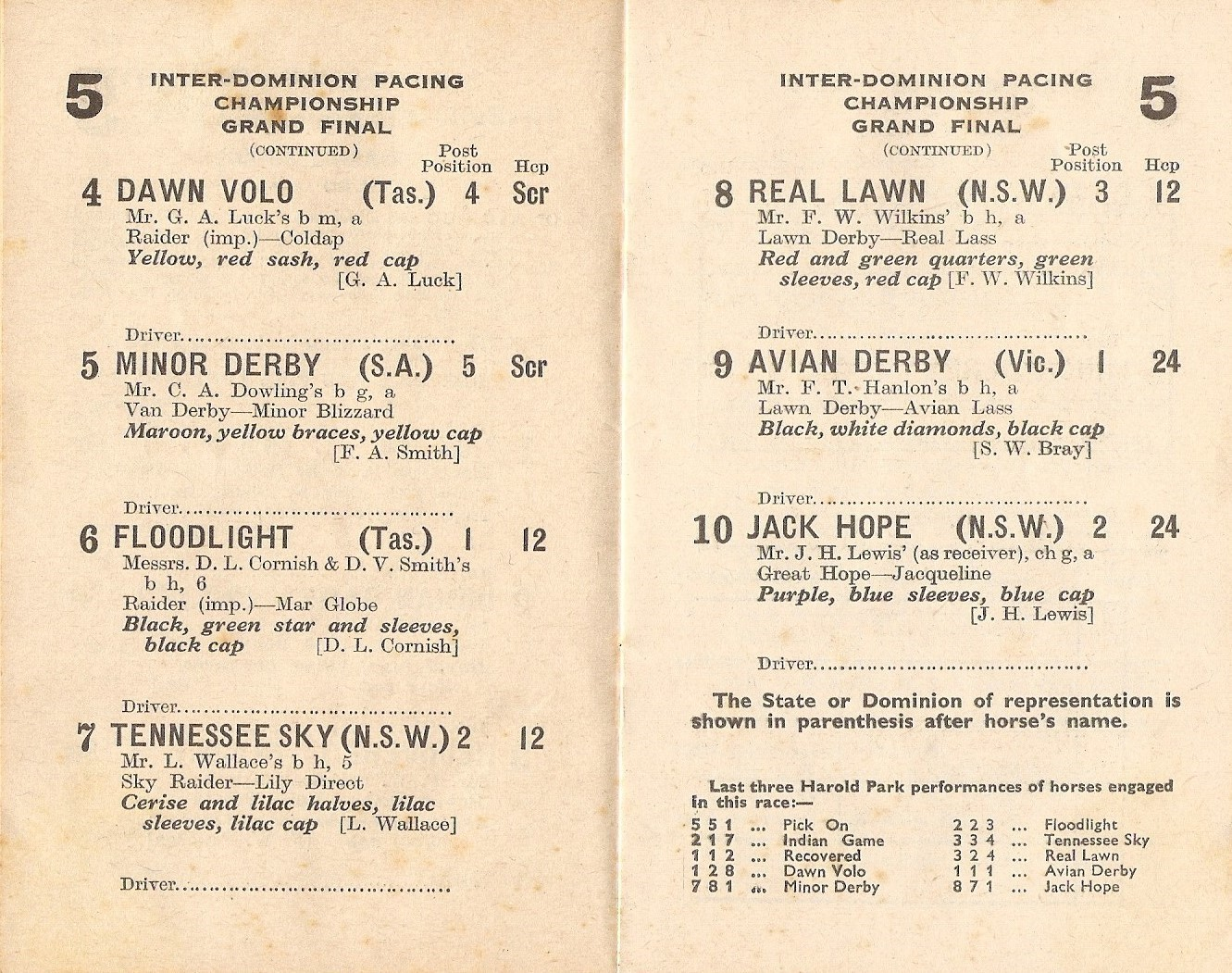
Racebook showing starters & the winner, Avian Derby.

== Closure ==
A members vote on 26 October 2008 voted in favour of the sale of Harold Park, on the condition that the land be sold for a minimum of $150 million. On 10 December 2010 it was announced the site had been purchased by Mirvac for $185 million to be redeveloped for medium-density housing. The adjoining Rozelle Tram Depot was also part of the paceway complex, and was turned into a food-centric retail complex that opened in September 2016.

The last race meeting was held at Harold Park Paceway on 17 December 2010, with Karloo Mick winning the final event. A special commemorative racebook was issued for the occasion. The winning post was sold for $10,000 to Ray Hadley, with the proceeds going to Lifeline. Other attendees took home various other souvenirs from the 120-year-old paceway.

The New South Wales Harness Racing Club re-located to the Club Menangle, a property that the Club had owned for many years. While Harold Park was in its final months, the new Club Menangle circuit was constructed, being 1400 metres in circumference – ideal for mile racing. Racing was then programmed for Tuesday afternoons and Saturday nights and the Club and complex continues to thrive in the Macarthur Region, one of Sydney's real growth areas.
