= Åby Racetrack =

Horse racing track in Mölndal, near Gothenburg, Sweden

Coordinates: 57.6504°N 12.0010°E

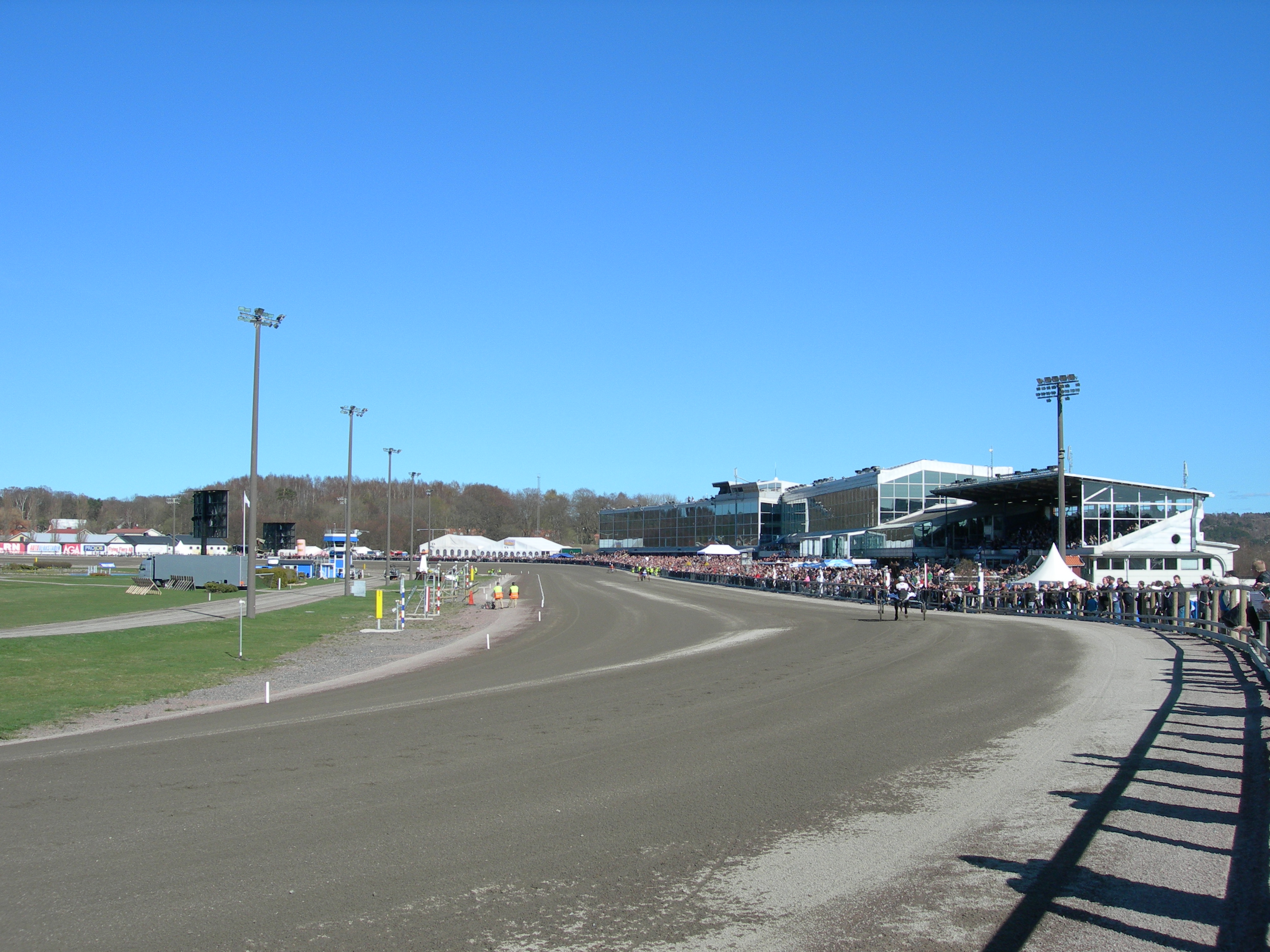
- Interactive map of Åby Racetrack
- Location: Mölndal, Sweden
- Date opened: 1936
- Race type: Standardbred – Harness racing
- Notable races: Olympiatravet, Åby Stora Pris, Konung Gustaf V:s Pokal, Drottning Silvias Pokal

Åby Racetrack (Swedish: Åbytravet) is a horse racing track located in Mölndal, 10 km south of Gothenburg, Sweden.

Åby was opened in 1936 as a track for harness racing as well as thoroughbred racing. Since October 1976, the track has been dedicated to harness racing solely.

Åby is the second biggest track for harness racing in Sweden. The length of the track is 1,000 meters.

== Major events ==
=== Olympiatravet ===
- International Group I race.
- Setup (2009): Final race of 2,140 meters. Finalists had either qualified in one of four specific elimination races in the month before the final or been rewarded a wild card. The title holder was guaranteed a place in the final as well.
- Date (2009): April 18 (the final).
- Purse (2009, the final only): US$462,772 (SEK 2,750,000), which made it the second biggest race in Sweden.
- Titleholder: Triton Sund (driven by Örjan Kihlström), winner in 2009.

=== Åby Stora Pris ===
- International Group I race.
- Setup (2008): Eight horses race two heats of 1,640 meters. These heats are followed by a race-off, also of 1,640 meters, if necessary, i.e. if the two heats are won by different horses.
- Date (2008): September 20.
- Purse (2008): US$359,451 (SEK 2,400,000).
- Titleholder: Garland Kronos (driven by Lutfi Kolgjini), winner in 2008.

=== Konung Gustaf V:s Pokal ===
- International Group I stakes race for four-year-old stallions and geldings.
- Setup (2009): Three elimination races from which the first four horses progressed to the final 14 days later. Final race of 2,140 meters.
- Date (2009): May 14 (the final).
- Purse (2009, the final only): ≈US$273,000 (€200,000).
- Titleholder: Knockout Rose (driven by Erik Adielsson), winner in 2009.

=== Drottning Silvias Pokal ===
- International Group I stakes race for four-year-old mares.
- Setup (2009): Four elimination races and final 14 days later. Final race of 2,140 meters.
- Date (2009): May 14 (the final).
- Purse (2009, the final only): ≈US$273,000 (€200,000).
- Titleholder: Mystic Lady U.S. (driven by Robert Bergh), winner in 2009.
