= Paleface Adios =

Australian Standardbred racehorse

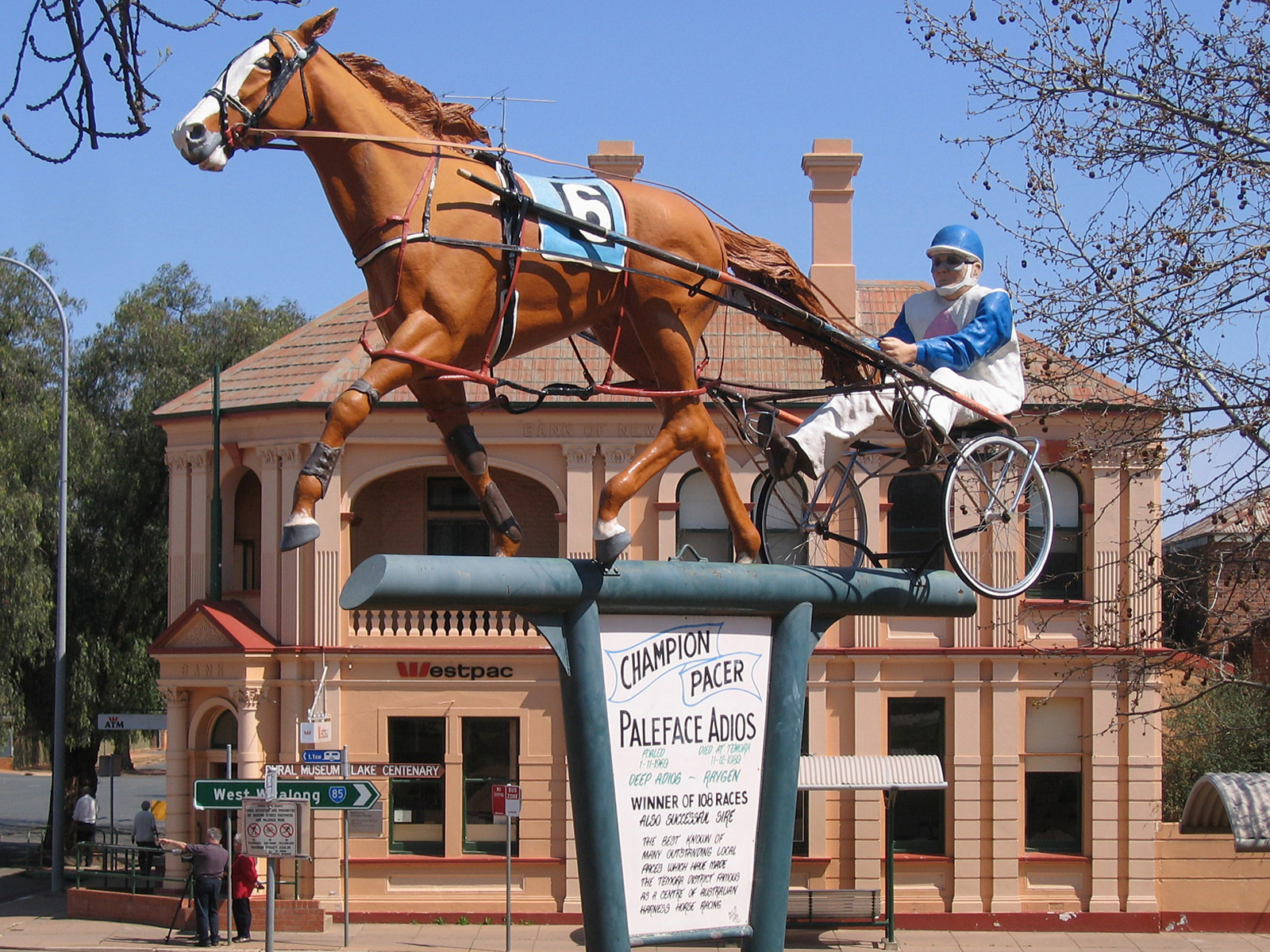
- Paleface Adios Memorial in Temora.
- Breed: Standardbred
- Discipline: Pacing
- Sire: Deep Adios (USA)
- Grandsire: Adios (USA)
- Dam: Rayjen
- Maternal grandsire: Brigade Command
- Sex: Stallion
- Foaled: 1 November 1969
- Country: Australia
- Color: Chestnut
- Owner: Shirley Pike
- Trainer: Colin Pike (and driver)

Record
- 240: 108-43-25

Earnings
- $535,640

Major wins
- 1973 Victoria Derby; 1973 New South Wales Derby; 1973 Queensland Derby; 1974 & 1976 Lord Mayors Cup; 1975 & 1977 Sir Clive Uhr Championship; 1976 Miracle Mile Pace; 1977 Winfield Cup

Awards
- Youngest Australian pacer to earn $100,000; World record 2:02.3 standing start 2,400m First Australian 3yo to break 2:00

Other awards
- Best mile rate: 1:57.6

Honors
- 1976/77 Aged Pacer of the Year & Australian Harness Horse of the Year; 1976/77 Australian Pacers Grand Circuit Champion
- Last updated on: 28 July 2011.

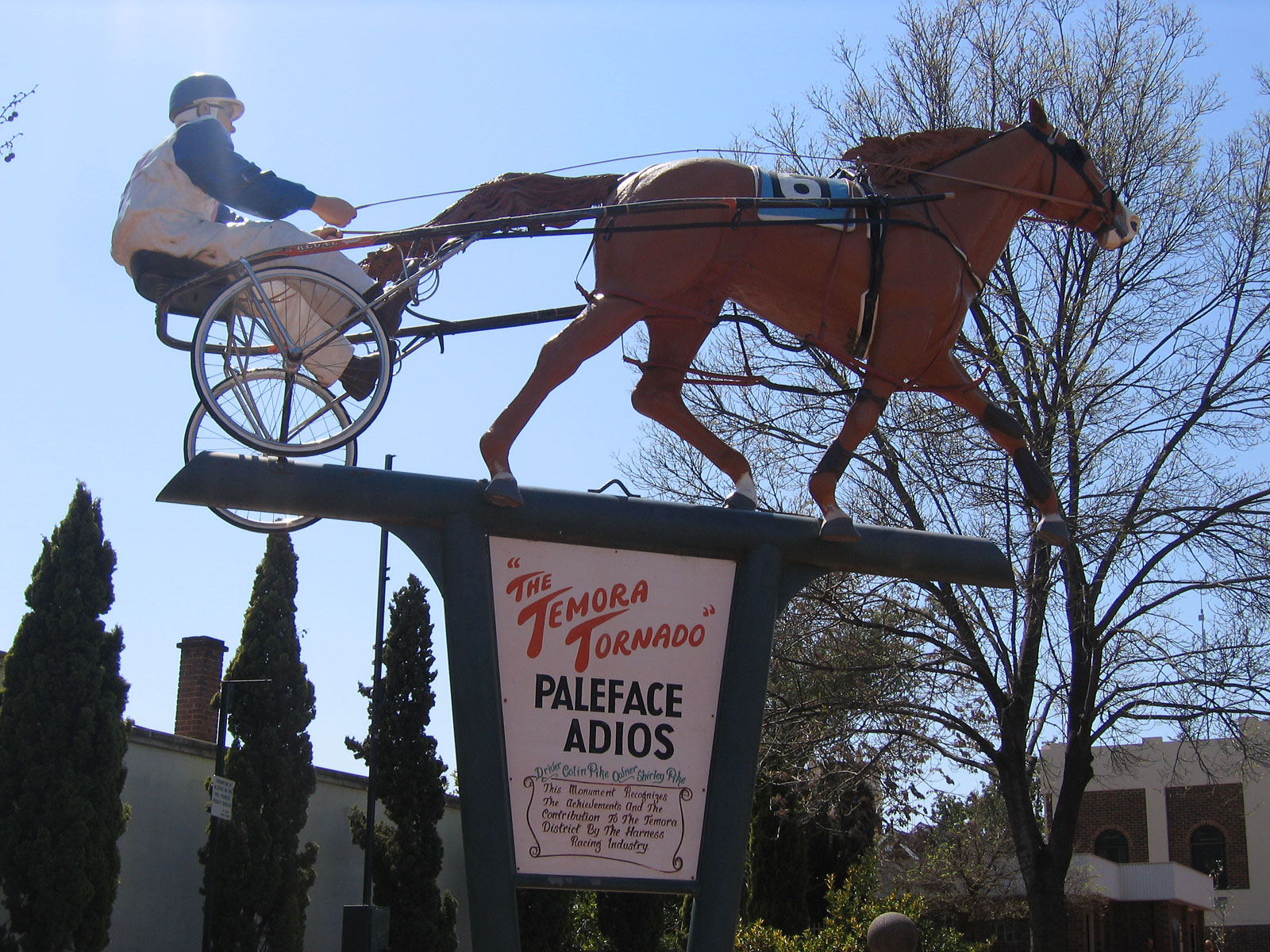
Front of the Memorial Statue

Paleface Adios (1969–1989) was an Australian harness racing horse which competed as a pacer throughout the 1970s and early 1980s. He raced from 1972 to 1981, (from the age of two years until he was retired at the age of 11 years) when there was top competition from the likes of the Hondo Grattan and Pure Steel.

He was a chestnut Standardbred pacer with a white blaze and feet, and a golden mane. Paleface Adios was foaled on 1 November 1969, at Temora, NSW and was by Deep Adios (by Adios) out of Rayjen by Brigade Command. Rayjen was the dam of several full siblings to Paleface Adios, but they failed to match his ability as racehorses.

== Racing record ==
Paleface Adios was trained and driven throughout his career by Colin Pike, and was owned by Colin's wife, Shirley Pike. He was nicknamed The Temora Tornado, in honour of the town where he was bred and trained. He raced with a 'daisy cutting' action which gave the impression that his feet were not touching the ground with each stride that he took. Paleface had brilliant early speed and when drawn from the front row of the mobile barrier or in a standing start was rarely headed at the start of his races. He did however win many races coming from back in the field with a sprint in the last lap.

The colt however made an inauspicious debut at Sydney's Harold Park as a two-year-old when he fell, as a short priced favourite. He started in an incredible seven consecutive Miracle Miles at Harold Park (one of Australia's Grand Circuit races which is invitation only) winning once in 1976 beating Don't Retreat and Hondo Grattan in a time of 1.58.4. The 1974 Miracle Mile will live in the memories of those that saw it as Paleface Adios and Hondo Grattan contested the last lap with victory going to Hondo Grattan over his arch-rival to the applause of the crowd. He was also second in the Miracle Mile four times and third once.

He never won Australasia's biggest race, the Inter Dominion but did win eight heats of the event including two heats in 1980 at Harold Park at the age of 10. In his first attempt at the Inter Dominion in 1974 he was involved in a multi horse fall at the start of the race and did not finish. He had the distinction of competing in the Sydney series with his full brother Jacraig Adios, a rare feat.

At one time he held the world record for 1,000 metres following a time trial at Hawkesbury, New South Wales. He became known as the 'Nellie Melba' of trotting as he was retired to stud on several occasions only to be brought back to racing again successfully at the top level. He raced throughout Australia – from Sydney, Canberra, Melbourne and Brisbane and across to Adelaide and Perth! He won many feature races other than the Miracle Mile such as the Sir Clive Uhr Championship at Albion Park in Brisbane in 1975 and 1977 and the Winfield Cup in Melbourne in 1977 where he defeated Pure Steel and Rip Van Winkle. He also won Cup races at Harold Park including the Lord Mayor's Cup in 1974 and 1976. He was second in the A G Hunter Cup in 1975 behind Royal Gaze and in 1977 to Pure Steel and was third in the Sir Clive Uhr Championship behind Don't Retreat in 1976 and second to Koala King in 1979. He was voted Australian Harness Horse of the Year for the 1976/77 season when he also won the Australian Pacers Grand Circuit. His historic hundredth race win came when he won the 1980 Cranbourne Cup.

During the 1970s, Paleface Adios became a household name in Australia, especially in Melbourne. Harness racing was featured weekly on Saturday night TV as part of the popular live variety show The Penthouse Club. His clashes with Hondo Grattan (the Bathurst Bulldog) were legendary.

== Summary ==
Paleface Adios had 240 starts, for 108 wins (second to Cane Smoke for the all-time most wins in a lifetime [bred in Australia]), 43 seconds and 25 thirds over his career for more than $500,000 in prizemoney.

In the early 1990s Paleface Adios was included in a satirical song honouring Australian sporting legends presented by Graham and The Colonel on ABC TV's The Late Show.

Paleface Adios died at Temora, NSW, on 11 December 1989. It is believed that this was a result of a snake bite but this was never confirmed. He is commemorated by a life-sized monument in Hoskins Street, the main street of Temora.

== See also ==
- Harness racing in Australia
