= Australasian Breeders Crown =

Horse racing series

The Australasian Breeders Crown is a futurity harness racing series for horses bred in Australia and New Zealand. The series is for two, three and four-year-old pacers and trotters.

It is held on a Sunday in late August at Tabcorp Park in Melton, Victoria.

Run by Harness Racing Victoria, the 2011 Australasian Breeders Crown will be held on Sunday 21 August, featuring 10 races and $1.56 million of stake money on offer.

== Winners ==
- 2002 Australasian Breeders Crown (2YO) - Kyvalley Road
- 2003 Australasian Breeders Crown (3YO) - Kyvalley Road
- 2006 Australasian Breeders Crown (3YO) - Right Interest
- 2007 Australasian Breeders Crown (Open) - Sundons Gift
- 2008 Australasian Breeders Crown (3YO) - Skyvalley
- 2008 Australasian Breeders Crown (Open) - Sundons Gift
- 2009 Australasian Breeders Crown (3YO) - Let Me Thru
- 2009 Australasian Breeders Crown (4YO) - Skyvalley
- 2010 Australasian Breeders Crown (4YO) - Let Me Thru
- 2010 Australasian Breeders Crown (Open) - Sundons Gift
