= Harness racing =

Form of horse racing that uses a two-wheeled cart

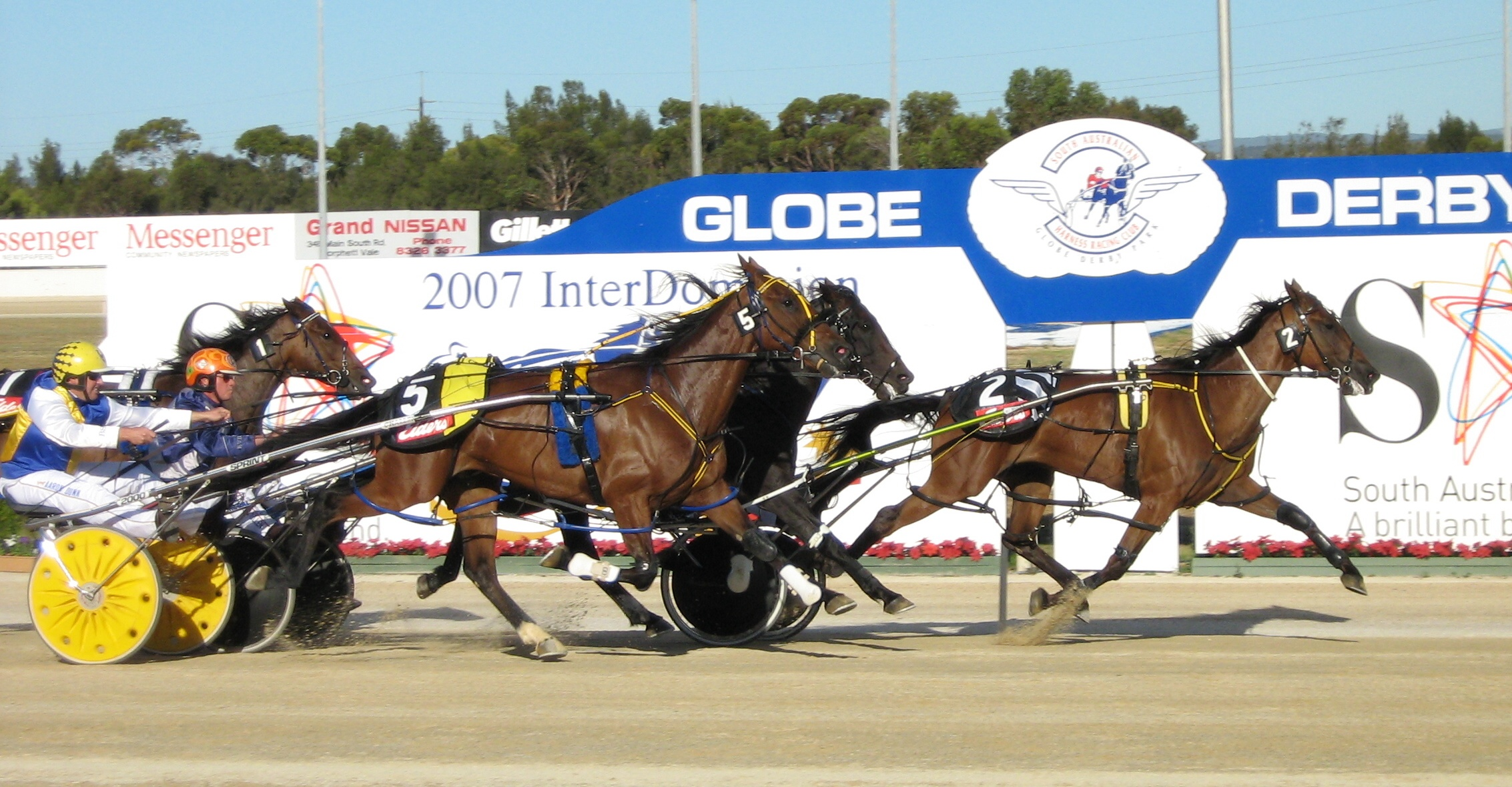
- Harness racing
- Highest governing body: Varies by nation
- Nicknames: Trotting race (the 'trots'), trotting, pacing race

Characteristics
- Contact: No
- Team members: Individual
- Mixed-sex: Yes for human drivers and trainers, horses may be separated by sex in some individual races, but not all
- Type: Outdoor
- Equipment: horse, sulky, horse harness
- Venue: Dirt racetrack

Presence
- Country or region: Worldwide

Harness racing

Harness racing is a form of horse racing in which the horses race at a specific gait (a trot or a pace). They usually pull a two-wheeled cart called a sulky, spider, or chariot occupied by a driver. In Europe, and less frequently in Australia and New Zealand, races with jockeys riding directly on saddled trotters (trot monté in French) are also conducted.

== Breeds ==
In North America, harness races are restricted to Standardbred horses, although European racehorses may also be French Trotters or Russian Trotters, or have mixed ancestry with lineages from multiple breeds. Orlov Trotters race separately in Russia. The light cold-blooded Coldblood trotters and Finnhorses race separately in Finland, Norway and Sweden.

Standardbreds are so named because in the early years of the Standardbred stud book, only horses who could trot or pace a mile in a standard time (or whose progeny could do so) of no more than 2 minutes, 30 seconds were admitted to the book. The horses have proportionally shorter legs than Thoroughbreds, and longer bodies. Standardbreds generally have a more placid disposition, due to the admixture of non-Thoroughbred blood in the breed.

The founding sire of today's Standardbred horse was Messenger, a gray Thoroughbred brought to America in 1788 and purchased by Henry Astor, brother of John Jacob Astor. Astor had the horse for two years on Long Island and then sold him to C.W. Van Rantz.

From Messenger came a great-grandson, Hambletonian 10 (1849–1876), a horse who gained a wide following for his racing prowess and successful offspring. The lineage of virtually all North American Standardbred race horses can be traced from four of Hambletonian 10's sons.

As of 1 January 2019, Foiled Again is the richest Standardbred horse in the world. Foiled Again retired on 1 January 2019, but the then 15-year-old gelding left an indelible mark in harness racing annals. He compiled a 331/109–70–46 record and earned an all-time record US$7,635,588 in purse money. In one of his last races at Rosecroft Raceway, he beat the then 10 year old career winner of over $600,000, Real Flight.

I'm Themightyquinn (foaled 2004) is an Australasian champion Standardbred notable for being a three-time Australian Harness Horse of the Year and three-time winner of the Inter Dominion (2011 - 2013). I'm Themightyquinn won over AUD 4.5 million in its career.

== Races ==
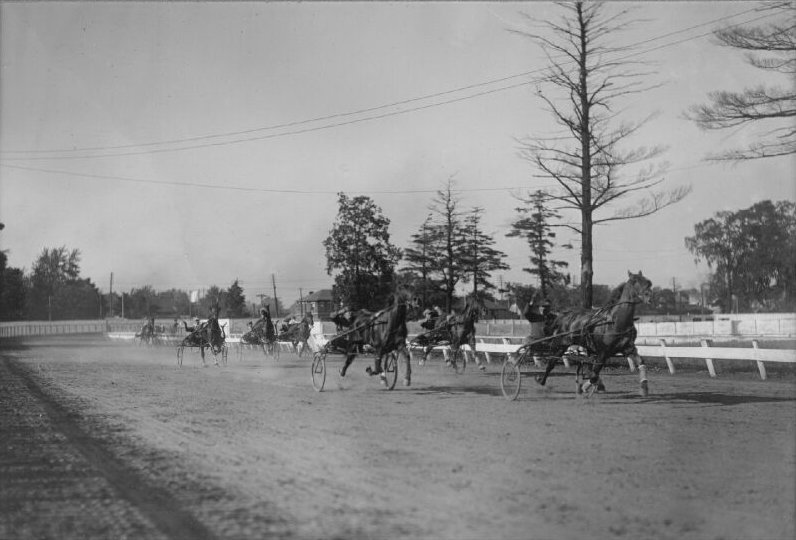
Harness racing in London, Ontario 1923

Races can be conducted in two differing gaits: trotting and pacing. The difference is that a trotter moves its legs forward in diagonal pairs (right front and left hind, then left front and right hind striking the ground simultaneously), whereas a pacer moves its legs laterally (right front and right hind together, then left front and left hind).

In continental Europe, races are conducted exclusively among trotters, whereas in Australia, Canada, New Zealand, the United Kingdom and the United States races are also held for pacers. Pacing races constitute 80% to 90% of the harness races conducted in North America - while the clear majority of harness racing in Australia and New Zealand are also now for pacers, even though the sport is colloquially still known as 'the trots.'

Pacing horses are faster and (most important to the bettor) less likely to break stride (a horse that starts to gallop must be slowed down and taken to the outside until it resumes trotting or pacing). One of the reasons pacers are less likely to break stride is that they often wear hobbles (straps connecting the legs on each of the horse's sides). The pace is a natural gait for these horses, and hobbles are used to maintain the gait at top speed; trotting hobbles (which employ a different design, due to the difference in the gait) are becoming increasingly popular for the same reason.

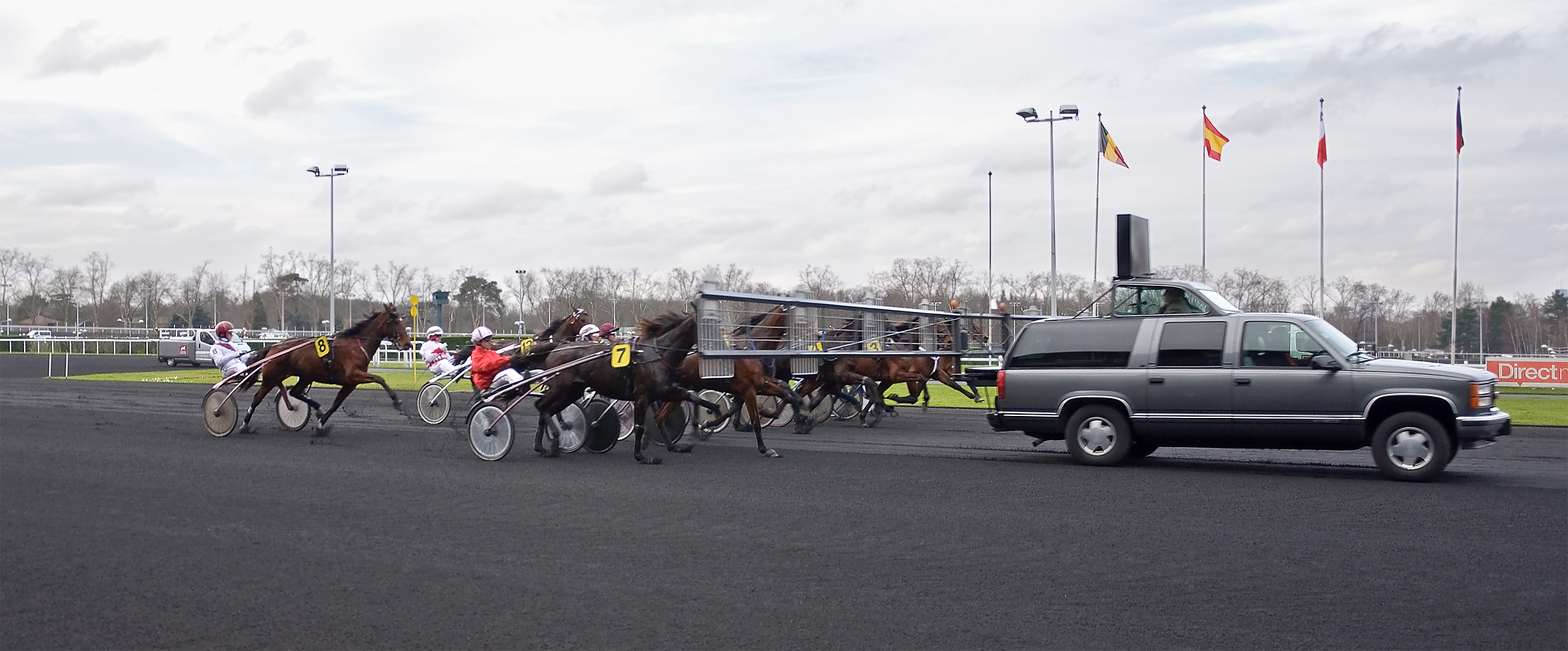
Mobile starting gate at Vincennes, France

Most harness races start from behind a motorized starting gate, also known as the mobile barrier. The horses commence pacing or trotting and line up behind a hinged gate mounted on a moving motor vehicle, which then leads them to the starting line. At the line, the wings of the gate are folded up and the vehicle accelerates away from the horses.

Another kind of start is a standing start, where there are tapes or imaginary lines across the track behind which the horses either stand stationary or trot in circles in pairs in a specific pattern to hit the starting line as a group. This enables handicaps to be placed on horses (according to class) with several tapes, usually with 10 or 20 meters between tapes. Many European – and some Australian and New Zealand – races use a standing start, although this increases the chance of a 'false start' where one or a number of horses commence 'off-stride' and gallop. The race must then be brought back to the starting line for a restart which can cause delays in programming and disrupts betting.

The sulky (informally known as a "bike", and also known as a spider) is a light, two-wheeled cart equipped with bicycle wheels. The driver (not a "jockey", as in thoroughbred racing) carries a light whip chiefly used to signal the horse by tapping and to make noise by striking the sulky shaft. There are strict rules as to how and how much the whip may be used; in some jurisdictions (like Norway), whips are forbidden. For exercising or training, the drivers use what is known as a "jog cart", which is a sulky that is heavier and bulkier than a racing unit.

== Racing ==
=== Europe ===
==== France ====
The Prix d'Amérique is considered to be the number-one trotting race in the world. It is held annually at the gigantic Vincennes hippodrome in eastern Paris late in January. The purse for the race in 2016 was 1 million euros, with approximately half of that to the winner. The horses are entered in the race based on lifetime earnings, unless they have qualified by performing well in the preceding six qualifying races.

==== Nordic Countries ====
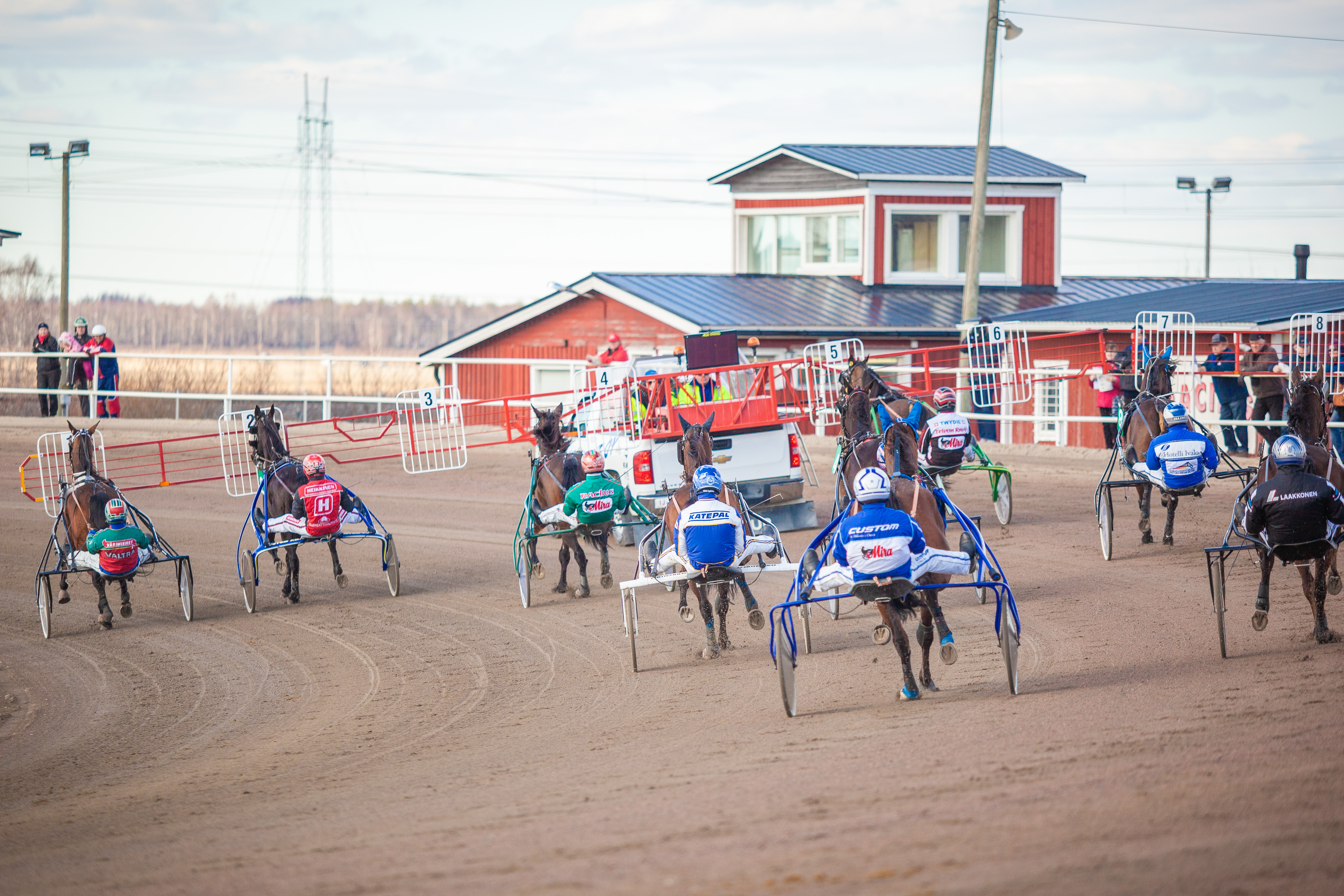
Harness racing on 13 April 2019, in Seinäjoki, Finland

Sweden is "the locomotive" of harness racing in Scandinavia. It is a professional all-year event, even at very high latitudes during the winter.

In Sweden there are 33 racing tracks, and in Finland 43. For comparison, there are only three thoroughbred racetracks in Sweden. One of them (Jägersro) is a combined thoroughbred and standardbred track, while another is only used once every year. So the only "pure" thoroughbred track in Sweden is Bro Park.

At Solvalla in the suburbs of Stockholm the premier Standardbred mile race is held in late May every year, Elitloppet (the Elite race). Other important annual races are Svenskt travkriterium, a race restricted to three-year-olds, also hosted at Solvalla and Swedish Trotting Derby (open for the best four-year-old horses) hosted in September at Jägersro in Malmö. The latter race track also hosts the Hugo Åbergs Memorial, which is an international race open for all horses.

Other important harness racing arenas in Scandinavia are Åby outside Gothenburg, Mantorp, Axevalla, Bergsåker, Boden (almost at the polar circle) and Charlottenlund in Danish capital Copenhagen.

A betting game called V75 is the number one game to bet on. The winner of seven (pre-decided) races (with 12 or 15 horses) is to be picked. One single "row" is very cheap to play, but people usually play large systems, picking the winner in one or two of the races and several horses in the other races. The price for a system grows rapidly if many horses are picked in a race. Price for one "row" is 1/2 SEK (approximately 0,05 euro) but if, for instance, betting on 2, 5, 1, 7, 7, 1 and 4 horses in the seven races the price multiplies as 0.5 × 2 × 5 × 1 × 7 × 7 × 1 × 4 = 980 SEK (approximately 92 euro). The bettors win money if they get all seven, six or five horses right within the system. But the difference between picking all 7 winners and just five is huge, in terms of money to win.

V75 races are of distances 1640 m ("short"), 2140 m ("normal"), 2640 m ("long") and rarely 3140 m ("extra long"). The race track's length most usually is 1000 meters (inner track) with two long sides and two curves. Horses run counterclockwise. The horses are classified by how much prize money they have gained through the entire career of the horse. The classifications are from the lowest and upwards:

1. Class III
2. Class II
3. Class I
4. Bronze division
5. Silver division
6. Gold division
- There is also a seventh class, for mares only. But mares also belong to one of the other six classifications.

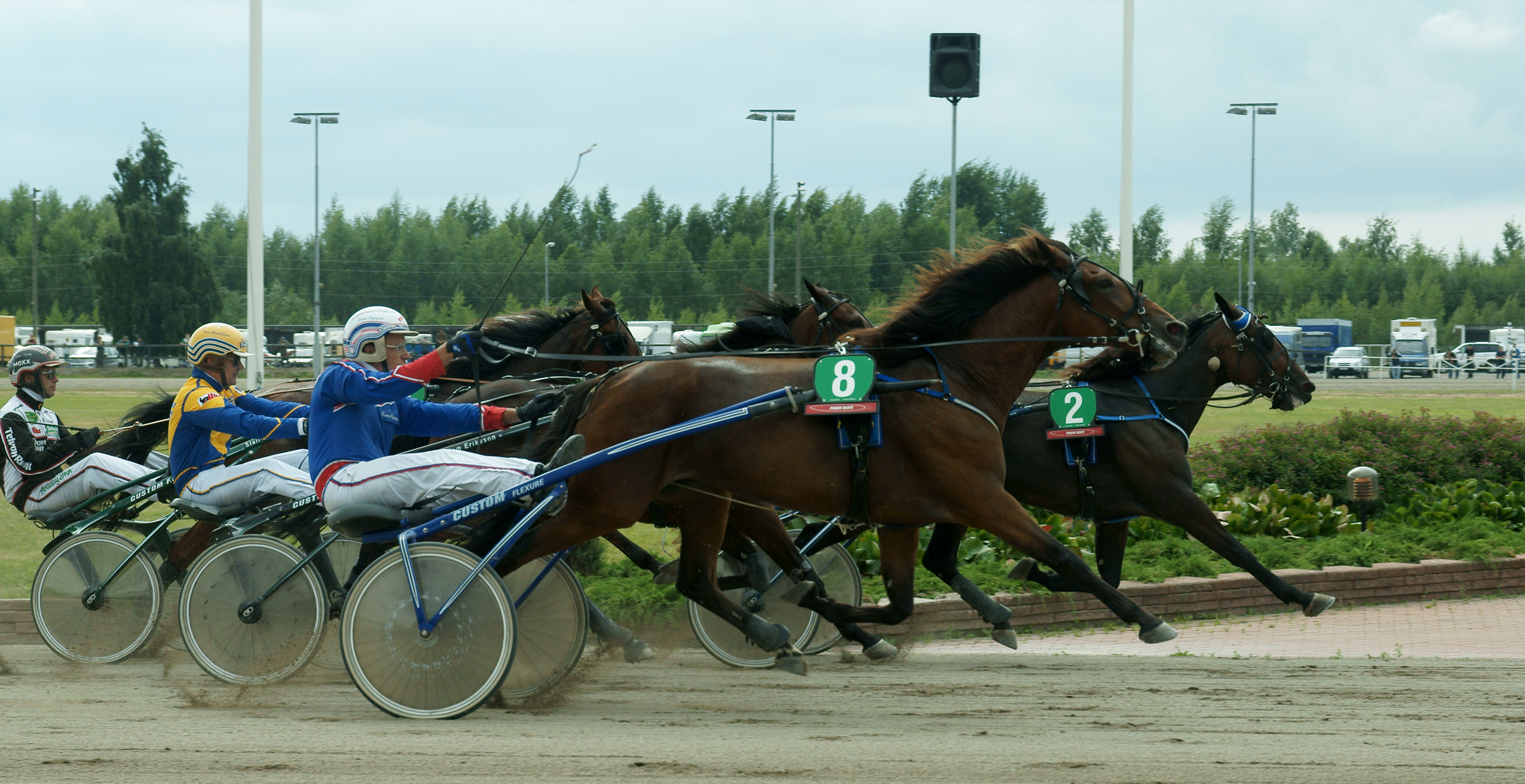
Harness racing in Pori, Finland in 2011. In the foreground Tuomo Ojanperä and the warm-blooded Sweet Sunrise.

Stallions (and castrated geldings) are considered a little better in general. In pure mare horse races, horses from higher classification get 20, 40 or up to 60 meter extra to run. Distance addition occurs also in races between classes. An example of such a race could be Silver division against Class II. In such a case the Silver Division horses must run 60 m behind the less experienced Class II horses.

Some races use the mobile starting gate as seen in the United States. Other races (for up to 16 horses) use a circular starting system. Horses with post positions 1 to 5 are in the first wave, 6-12 or 15 are in the second wave. In volt start good starting numbers (which automatically turn into certain positions) are 1, 3 and 5 (slightly better than 2 and 4). But numbers 6 and 7 (who start in the second volt together with number 8 and higher) may get up a better speed after the turn-around but before the starting whistle sounds. Horses may have different initial speed, but must not exceed the starting line before the start signal sounds. Horses number 6 and 7 can both get a better speed at the starting line, and there are no horses in front of them. Due to this number 6 and number 7 are known as "running tracks" at volt starting. Horses 8, 9, 10, 11, 12 and 13, 14, 15 have all horses in front of them. But to get advantage of the "running tracks" the horse must be "a fast starter".

The start of the races and the starting position (which equals a certain number as explained previously) are indeed important, independent of the start method. A very good horse in a race with weak opponents but with a bad start number (like 12 or higher) may not become the prime favorite due to the bad starting position, especially at short distance.

After the start the drivers fight to get a good running position. How well this succeeds depends on the horse, the starting position and how the opponents drive their horses. Due to the sulky width and the oval race track overtaking is a far more difficult maneuver to achieve, in comparison with gallop racing. The "running position fight" during the start and the beginning of the race usually ends in the first turn. After the initial fight for a good running position, the horses usually form two rows or tracks. Good running positions are the leading position of the inner track or the second (or third) place in the outer track. This is explained by the fact that the outer track is close to 15 meters longer per lap, front running is always heavier compared with just follow behind (just like in cycling). Positions in the inner track behind the leader may appear the best. But as described before, overtaking is not an easy maneuver. And horses in the inner track may very well be trapped all the way to the finish, due to the horses and sulkies in the outer track. On the other hand, if an opening in the outer track appears close to the finish line, such a horse has had "an easy ride" with much strength left to give.

The leading position of the outer track, also known as the position of "death", is a very hard position to run and only very strong horses can win from this position. If a horse completes the race from the "death" position, commentators often point that out when announcing the KM pace of the horse.

On short distances (1640 meters), the horse that gets the leading position of the inner track has a very good chance to be the winner. At longer races (with rather even competitors) running positions like second or third in the outer track have good chances, especially if the inner track horses get trapped behind a weakening front horse.

Though all kind of trot betting in terms of money, is the most popular type of betting in Sweden, attendances at the races do not correspond to this. Even when "the V75 circuit comes to town" attendance rarely exceeds 5000 people. Larger crowds only gather at the biggest races. Trot racing as a sport is often considered dull, but when combined with betting it can rapidly get interesting. The huge popularity of trot betting in Sweden "spills over" to the neighboring Norway (11 racing tracks), Finland (43) and Denmark (9).

==== Ireland ====
Standardbred harness racing in Ireland includes both trotting and pacing. Licensed racing is organized by the Irish Harness Racing Association (IHRA), which operates meets at several venues in both the Republic of Ireland and Northern Ireland, but mainly at Portmarnock Raceway near Dublin. In Northern Ireland, harness racing has traditionally been organized by the Northern Ireland Standardbred Association (NISA) which coordinated with British Harness Racing Club (BHRC), while the now-defunct Irish Harness Racing Club (IHRC) operated only in the Republic of Ireland. Both IHRA and NISA organize races at Annaghmore Raceway in Northern Ireland, with NISA also leasing Racetime Raceway near Belfast with the intention of having regulated races there.

In Ireland, there is a clash between the public and those participating in the illegal practice of "sulky racing" on public roads, which blocks traffic and has caused accidents involving horses, sulky drivers, spectators, and other road users. There have been calls to further regulate the practice and to provide safer venues for a sport popular with the Traveller community.

==== Other countries in Europe ====
Trotting sport and betting also exist in Austria, Belgium, Germany, Hungary, Serbia, Italy, the Netherlands, Malta, Russia, United Kingdom and Estonia. In Italy "trotto" is as popular as "galoppo".

=== North America ===
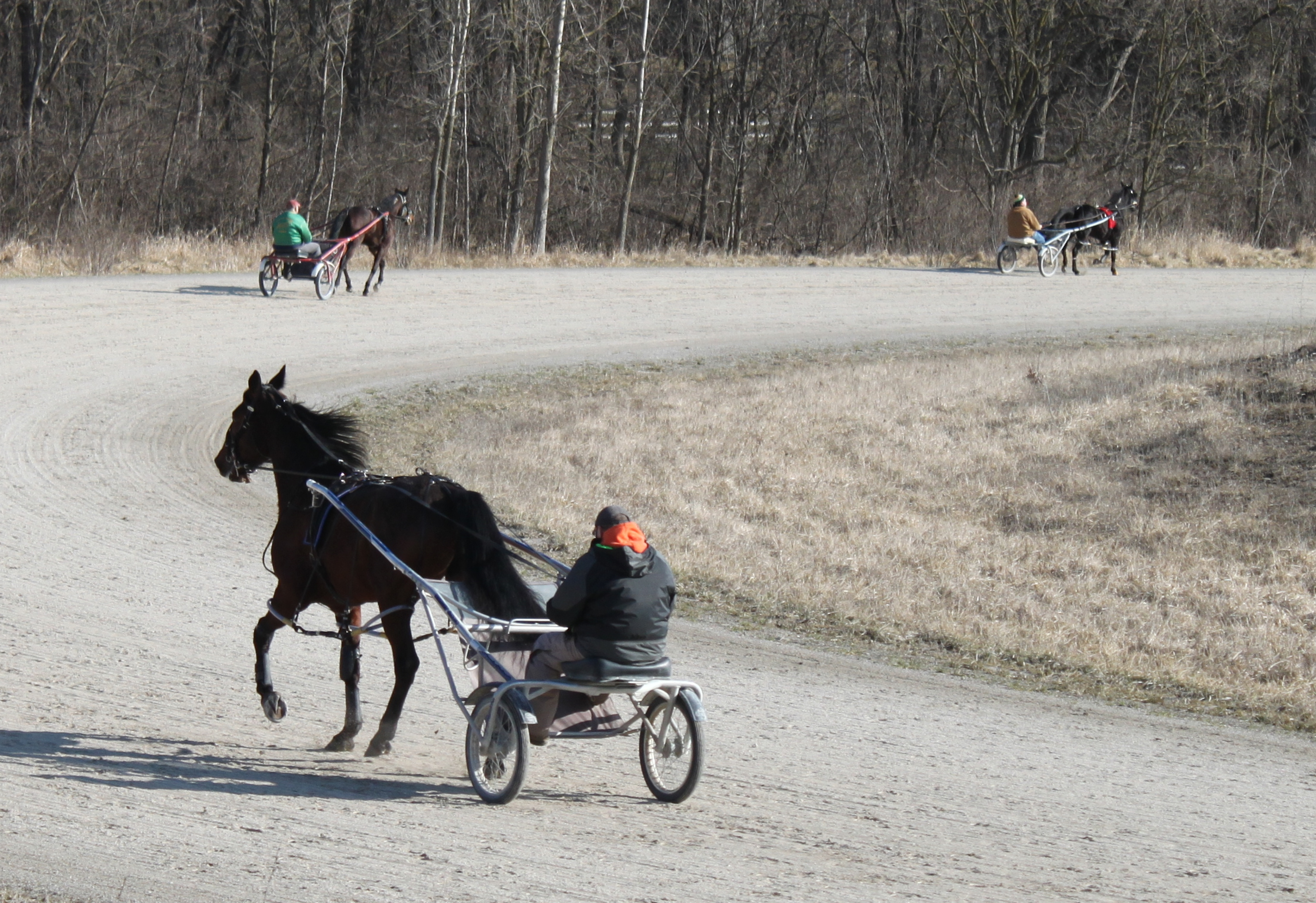
Harness racing horses being exercised, Salem Township, Michigan

Almost all North American races are at a distance of one mile (1,609 m). Most races are run on tracks constructed solely for harness racing (some with banked turns), but a few tracks conduct both harness and Thoroughbred flat racing. North American harness horses earn a "mark" (a record), which is their fastest winning time at that distance. Harness races involve a good deal of strategy.

Though the vast majority of races are one mile, races are contested on several different size tracks. The most common are 1/2 mile, 5/8 mile, and 1-mile tracks. Certain horses are better on the smaller tracks and others are better on the 1-mile tracks because there are fewer turns. Also, on the shorter tracks, early speed is important, while the longer stretch run of a mile track favors horses with late speed for come-from-behind wins.

Usually, several drivers will contend for the lead away from the gate. They then try to avoid getting "boxed in" as the horses form into two lines – one on the rail and the other outside – in the second quarter-mile. They may decide to go to the front; to race on the front on the outside ("first over", a difficult position); or to race with "cover" on the outside. On the rail behind the leader is a choice spot, known as the "pocket", and a horse in that position is said to have a "garden trip". Third on the rail is an undesirable spot, known on small tracks as the "death hole".

As the race nears the three-quarter mile mark, the drivers implement their tactics for advancing their positions – going to the lead early; circling the field; moving up an open rail; advancing behind a horse expected to tire and so on. Harness horses accelerate during the final quarter-mile of a race. The finish of a harness race is exciting, and often extremely close. The judges have a photo-finish camera to help them determine the order of finish if needed.

Until the 1990s harness tracks featured a rail on the inside, much like the one at Thoroughbred tracks. This "hub rail" was replaced with a row of short pylons (usually of a flexible material), which mark the inside boundary of the course. This change was mainly for safety reasons; it allows a driver to pull off to the inside of the course if necessary, such as when their horse breaks stride but they cannot move to the outside due to being boxed in, thus avoiding injury to himself, his horse, and other competitors.

This change allowed another innovation, "open-stretch racing". (As of 2011 open-lane racing is not universal.). An additional lane is available to the inside of where the rail would have been. If the race leader is positioned on the rail at the top of the homestretch, that leader is required by rule to maintain that line (or move further out), while horses behind the leader can move into the open lane with room to pass the leader if possible. This solves a common problem, in which trailing horses are "boxed in" (behind the leader, with another horse outside). It makes races more wide-open, with potentially higher payoffs — and more attractive to bettors.

=== Australia and New Zealand ===
Australian racing differs from North American racing in that metric distances are used, generally above the equivalent of one mile and horses are classed by how many wins they have. Another large difference is that in Australian racing the leader does not have to hand up the lead to any horse that challenges, often leaving a horse parked outside the leader in the "death seat" or simply "the death" (known as "facing the breeze" in New Zealand), as this horse covers more ground than the leader. Australian racing generally has more horses in each race; a field of 12 or 13 is not uncommon. This generally means that with the smaller tracks a "three-wide train" starts as the field gets the bell at signal their final lap.

New Zealand racing is quite similar to that of Australia. Many horses are able to easily "cross the Tasman" and compete as well on either side of the sea that separates Australia and New Zealand. In both New Zealand and Australia the same system of an 'open lane' operates, although in Australia it is called a 'sprint lane' and in New Zealand a 'passing lane'. These lanes do not operate on all tracks and have been a point of argument between many industry participants.

Modern Starting gates used in Australia now include Auto start. This innovation allows the starter to concentrate on the actual horse's positioning during the "score up".

The modern Starting gates use only a driver for steering the vehicle and a starter in the rear to observe the race and call a false start if required. The start speed, acceleration, score up distance, and gate closing are controlled via a computer system, which takes control of the vehicle and provides a printout at the end of the score up. Some harness racing clubs have been granted additional funds for the installation of the AVA computerised mobile barriers.

== Important races ==
=== United States and Canada ===
Important annual races include the Hambletonian for 3-year-old trotters, the Little Brown Jug for 3-year-old pacers, and the Breeders Crown series of twelve races covering each of the traditional categories of age, gait and sex. The Hambletonian is part of the Trotting Triple Crown and the Little Brown Jug is part of the Pacing Triple Crown. Important Canadian races include the North America Cup, the Canadian Pacing Derby, the Maple Leaf Trot, the Camluck Classic, the Gold Cup and Saucer, and the Mohawk Million.

The harness racing industry conducts an annual Grand Circuit, which includes many of the most prestigious races for both pacers and trotters. Founded in 1871 and first conducted in 1873 at four tracks, the Grand Circuit now visits 20 tracks as of the 2021 season.

The most notable harness tracks in North America are the Meadowlands Racetrack in East Rutherford, New Jersey, Yonkers Raceway in Yonkers, New York, The Red Mile in Lexington, Kentucky, and Mohawk Park in Campbellville, Ontario. Since 1947, the United States Harness Writers Association annually votes for the "Harness Horse of the Year."

=== Australia and New Zealand ===
The marquee event of Australasian racing is the Inter Dominion Series, which includes a pacing series and a trotting series. The series is held yearly and rotated around the Australian State Controlling Bodies and once every four years the Inter Dominion Championships are held in New Zealand.

The major events for open age pacers in Australia are the Miracle Mile Pace, A.G. Hunter Cup, Victoria Cup and the Australian Pacing Championship. The most prestigious events for three-year-olds including the Victoria Derby, the New South Wales Derby and the Australian Derby. For the younger horses there are series that stem from yearling sales including the Australian Pacing Gold and an Australasian Breeders Crown.

In New Zealand the major races include the New Zealand Cup and Auckland Cup as well as the New Zealand Free For All, Noel J Taylor Memorial Mile and the New Zealand Messenger Championship. There are also the New Zealand Derby and the Great Northern Derby for three-year-olds, and the Dominion Handicap and Rowe Cup for trotters. The Harness Jewels raceday (the end-of-year championships for two-, three- and four-year-olds) takes place in late May/early June

The major open races in Australia and New Zealand are brought together in an Australasian Pacers Grand Circuit.

=== Europe ===
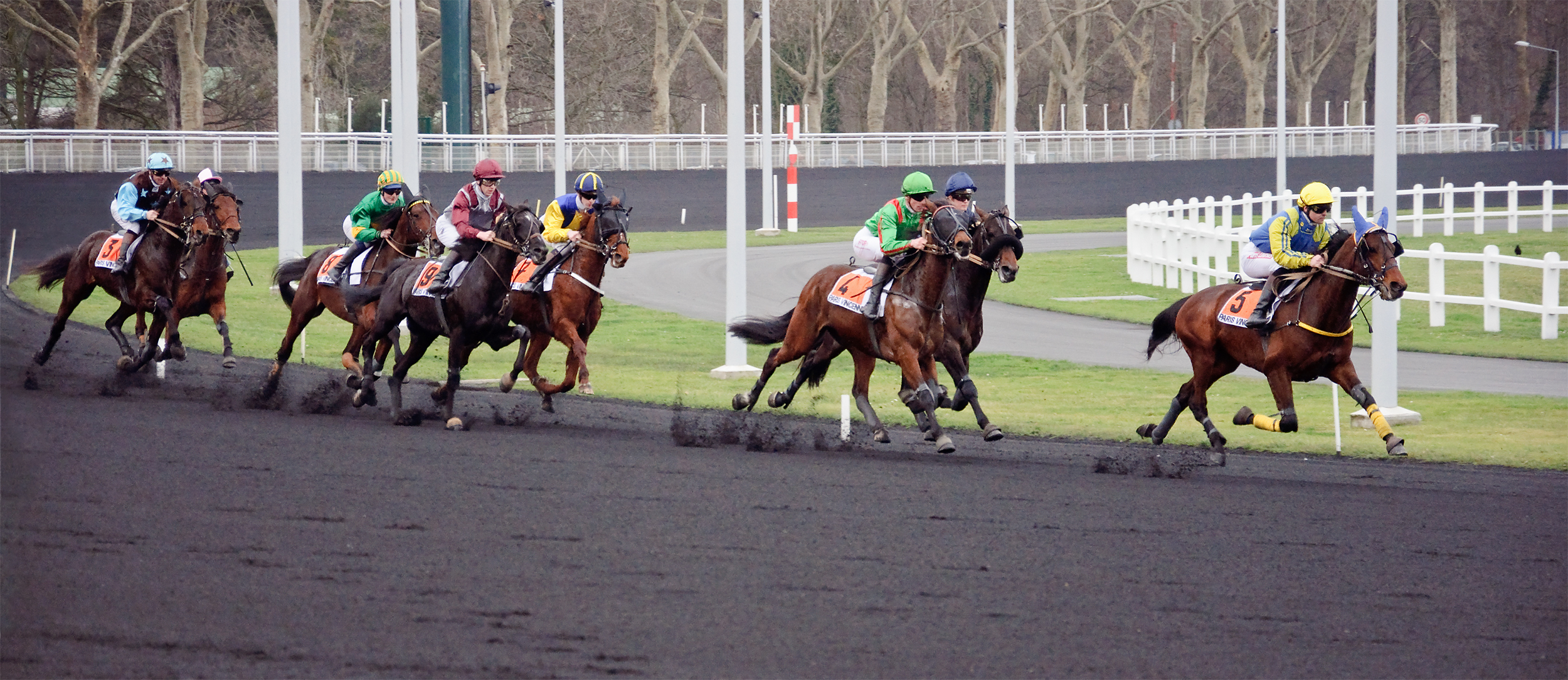
Trotters racing under saddle at Vincennes racecourse

The leading harness racing nations in Europe are France, Italy and Sweden, and the sport is fairly popular in most northern European countries. Practically all races in Europe are trotting races.

The Prix d'Amérique at Vincennes hippodrome is widely considered to be the most prestigious event of the European racing year. Other notable races include the Elitloppet one-mile race in Solvalla, Sweden and Gran Premio Lotteria di Agnano in Naples, Italy.

The annual European Grand Circuit consists of major races for top-level trotters. Major harness racing nations also host national championship events for young horses.

Monté (races to saddle) have recently been introduced in larger scale in Sweden and Norway, to increase interest and recruitment to the sport. Saddled events are also commonplace in France and though less frequent, they are not considered exceptional in other European trotting nations.

== See also ==
- Chariot racing
- Carriage driving
- Älgen Stolta
- Australasian Pacers Grand Circuit
- Canadian Horse Racing Hall of Fame
- Harness Racing Museum & Hall of Fame
- Harness racing in Australia
- Harness racing in New Zealand
- Harness racing in Sweden
- List of films about horse racing
- List of French trotting horse races
