= List of articles about Australia and New Zealand jointly =

The following articles refer or relate to the subject matter of Australia – New Zealand as a conjoint or unified entity, or otherwise refer or relate to aspects of Australia – New Zealand relations, comparisons between Australia and New Zealand, the culture of Australia – New Zealand, Australia – New Zealand business and other entities, governance and standardisation in Australia-New Zealand, Australia – New Zealand lists and comparisons, the economy of Australia – New Zealand, Australia – New Zealand-focused publications, and individuals with notable affinity to and/or significance for Australia and New Zealand concurrently:

== Sport ==
- 1907–1908 New Zealand rugby tour of Australia and Great Britain
- 1908 Melbourne Carnival
- 1911–12 Kangaroo tour of Great Britain
- 2008 Rugby League World Cup final
- 2013 Rugby League World Cup final
- 2023 FIFA Women's World Cup
- A-League
- Anzac Test
- Australasia at the 1908 Summer Olympics
- Australasia at the 1912 Summer Olympics
- Australasia GAA
- Australasian Super League
- Australasian Championships
- Australasian Intervarsity Debating Championships
- Australasian Safari
- Australasian Breeders Crown
- Australasian Football Council
- Australasian Pacers Grand Circuit
- Australasian Schools English Competition
- Australasian Schools Writing Competition
- Australia–New Zealand sports rivalries
- Glossary of Australian and New Zealand punting
- Inter Dominion
  - Inter Dominion Pacing Championship
  - Inter Dominion Trotting Championship
  - Inter Dominion Hall of Fame
- Jubilee Australasian Football Carnival
- National Basketball League (Australasia)
- National Rugby League
- PGA Tour of Australasia
- Super Rugby
- Tasman Series
- V8 Supercars

== Business and other entities ==
- Anabaptist Association of Australia and New Zealand
- Antiochian Orthodox Archdiocese of Australia, New Zealand, and All Oceania
- ANZ Bank
- Association of Australasian Palaeontologists
- Australasian Legal Information Institute
- Australasian Performing Right Association
- Australasian Division
- Australasian Law Teachers Association
- Australasian Society for Historical Archaeology
- Australasian Plant Pathology Society
- Australasian College of Health Informatics
- Australasian College of Tropical Medicine
- Australasian Trauma Society
- Australasian Society for Computers in Learning in Tertiary Education
- Australasian College of Physical Scientists and Engineers in Medicine
- Australasian Seabird Group
- Australasian College of Health Sciences USA
- Australasian Meat Industry Employees Union
- Australasian College for Emergency Medicine
- Australasian Police Multicultural Advisory Bureau
- Australasian Association of Philosophy
- Australasian Computer Music Association
- Australasian Union of Jewish Students
- Australasian Society for Experimental Psychology
- Australasian Regional Association of Zoological Parks and Aquaria
- Australasian Wader Studies Group
- Australasian Ornithological Conference
- Australasian Correctional Management
- Australasian Anti-Transportation League

- Australasian Anti-Transportation League Flag

- Australasian Raptor Association
- Australia and New Zealand Association of Clerks-at-the-Table
- Australia and New Zealand School of Government
- Australian and New Zealand Association for the Advancement of Science
- Australian and New Zealand Association of Antiquarian Booksellers
- Australian and New Zealand College of Anaesthetists
- Australian and New Zealand Cultural Arts
- Australia and New Zealand Unitarian Universalist Association
- Australian and New Zealand Society of Indexers
- Australian and New Zealand Law and History Society
- Australian and New Zealand Exchange
- Clean Air Society of Australia and New Zealand
- Fair Trade Association of Australia and New Zealand
- Federal Council of Australasia
- Food Standards Australia New Zealand
- Greek Orthodox Archdiocese of Australia and New Zealand
- Insulation Council of Australia and New Zealand
- Rabbinical College of Australia and New Zealand
- Redemptorists of Australia and New Zealand
- Royal Australasian College of Physicians
  - Fellow of the Royal Australasian College of Physicians
- Royal Australasian College of Dental Surgeons
- Royal Australasian College of Surgeons
- Royal Australasian Ornithologists Union
  - Royal Australasian Ornithologists Union Fellows
- Royal Australian and New Zealand College of Psychiatrists
- Royal Australian and New Zealand College of Radiologists
- Royal Australian and New Zealand College of Ophthalmologists
- Royal Australian and New Zealand College of Obstetricians and Gynaecologists
- Westpac

== Governance and standardisation ==
- ANZUS
- Australia–New Zealand Maritime Treaty
- Australian and New Zealand Standard Research Classification
- Australian and New Zealand Standard Industrial Classification
- Australian and New Zealand television frequencies
- Australasian Inter-Service Incident Management System
- Australasian New Car Assessment Program
- Australasian signed English
- British currency in Oceania
- Closer Economic Relations
- Etiquette in Australia and New Zealand
- Joint Accreditation System of Australia and New Zealand

== Military, exploration and pioneering efforts ==
- ANZAC
  - Anzac Bridge
  - Anzac Day
  - Anzac Parade, Canberra
  - Anzac Parade, Sydney
- Australasian Antarctic Expedition
- New Zealand Memorial, Canberra
- Battle of Sari Bair
- British Australian and New Zealand Antarctic Research Expedition
- Crossing the Ditch
- Moncrieff and Hood disappearance
- New Zealand and Australian Division
- Southern Cross (aircraft)
- Southern Cross Cable
- Western Base party

== Food, culture, entertainment and architecture ==
- Animal Planet (Australia and New Zealand)
- Australasian literature
- Etiquette in Australia and New Zealand
- Glossary of Australian and New Zealand punting
- List of Oceanian films
- List of Australian and New Zealand dishes
- Meat pie (Australia and New Zealand)
- Pavlova
- Playhouse Disney (Australia and New Zealand)
- UKTV
- Urban Music Awards Australia and New Zealand

== Publications ==
- Australian and New Zealand Wine Industry Journal
- Australasian Agribusiness Review
- Australasian Record
- Australasian Post
- Australasian Journal of Philosophy
- Australasian Science
- Australasian Radiology
- Australasian Plant Pathology
- Australasian Journal of Educational Technology
- Australasian Journal of Bone & Joint Medicine
- Emu (journal)
- Handbook of Australian, New Zealand and Antarctic Birds
- We Will Rock You: Australasian Edition

== Lists and comparisons ==
- List of Australian and New Zealand advertising characters
- List of Australian and New Zealand sheep breeds
- Median household income in Australia and New Zealand

== Noteworthy individuals ==
=== Australian-born ===
- Charles Kingsford Smith first Australian to fly to New Zealand
- Carl Berendsen (civil servant/diplomat)
- Keisha Castle-Hughes (actor)
- Frederick Doidge (National)
- Roger Donaldson (film producer)
- Harry Holland (Labour)
- Mabel Howard (Labour)
- Gordon Hultquist (Labour)
- William Larnach (businessman/politician)
- Russel Norman (Green)
- Charles Norwood (businessman)
- Matt Robson (Alliance/Progressive)
- Michael Savage (Labour)
- Bob Semple (Labour)
- Jerry Skinner (Labour)
- Esme Tombleson (National)
- Hugh Watt (Labour)
- Joseph Ward (Liberal)
- Paddy Webb (Labour)

=== British-born ===
- James Cook - coastal explorer of Australia and New Zealand
- Edward Gibbon Wakefield - proponent of the colonisation of South Australia and New Zealand

=== New Zealand-born ===
- Joh Bjelke-Petersen
- Adam Campbell (Australian footballer)
- John Clarke a.k.a. 'Fred Dagg'
- Trent Croad
- Russell Crowe
- Donald Dickie
- William Hudson
- Harry Haughton
- Warren Jones (footballer)
- Jay Laga'aia
- Thomas O'Halloran
- Brent Renouf
- Ricky May
- Daniel McAlister
- Joe Sellwood
- Marty McDonnell
- Mike Rann
- Wayne Schwass
- Pamela Stephenson
- Phar Lap (racehorse)
- Nancy Wake
- Richard Wilkins
- Barney Wood

== Other ==
- Australia–New Zealand relations
