= New Zealand women's national cricket team record by opponent =

Team's performance record

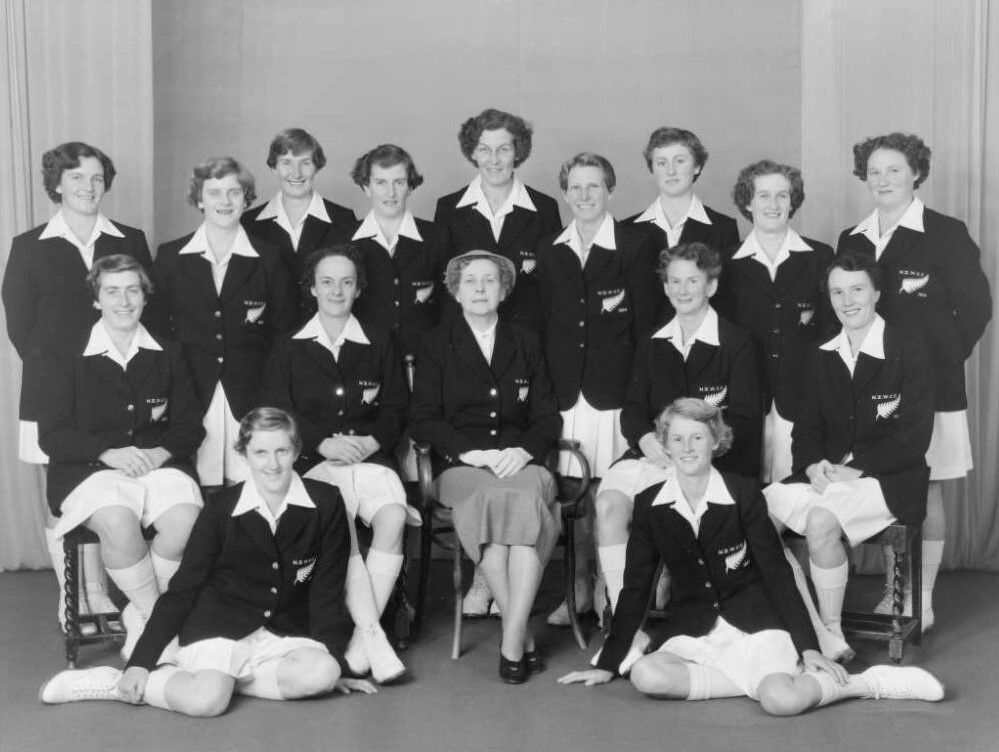
New Zealand women's cricket team, United Kingdom tour of 1954

The New Zealand women's national cricket team represents New Zealand in international women's cricket. A full member of the International Cricket Council (ICC), the team is governed by New Zealand Cricket. The New Zealand women's national cricket team competed in international cricket for the first time in 1935 when they played against England in a one-off Test at home. They recorded their first Test victory against South Africa in 1972. As of June 2021, they have played 45 Test matches against four different opponents—Australia, England, India, and South Africa. Out of these, New Zealand have won only 2 matches, against Australia and South Africa; 10 have resulted in a loss, while 33 have ended in a draw.

New Zealand played their first Women's One Day International cricket (WODI) match against Trinidad and Tobago in the 1973 World Cup, in which they won by 136 runs. As of June 2021, they have played 347 WODIs against thirteen different opponents, and have the third most victories (171) for any team in the format. Out of these, they have played 132 matches against arch rivals Australia, recording only 31 wins. New Zealand have been most successful against England, winning 35 times against the team. They have won the Women's World Cup once, in 2000. Since their first Women's Twenty20 International (WT20I) against England in 2004, New Zealand have played 133 WT20I matches as of June 2021. They have recorded 76 wins and have been the third most successful team in the format. New Zealand have recorded the highest number of wins (21) against Australia. They have participated in all editions of the Women's T20 World Cup, and have been the runners-up twice, in 2009 and 2010.

== Key ==
- M – Denotes the number of matches played
- W – Denotes the number of wins for New Zealand against the listed opponent
- L – Denotes the number of losses for New Zealand against the listed opponent
- T – Denotes the number of ties between New Zealand and the listed opponent
- D – Denotes the number of draws between New Zealand and the listed opponent
- NR – Denotes the number of no results between New Zealand and the listed opponent
- Tie+W – Number of matches tied and then won in a tiebreaker such as a bowl-out or Super Over
- Tie+L – Number of matches tied and then lost in a tiebreaker such as a bowl-out or Super Over
- Win% – Win percentage (in ODI and T20I cricket, a tie counts as half a win, and no results are disregarded)
- Loss% – Loss percentage
- Draw% – Draw percentage
- First – Year of the first match between New Zealand and the listed opponent
- Last – Year of the latest match between New Zealand and the listed opponent

== Test cricket ==
New Zealand women Test cricket record by opponent
Opponent	M	W	L	D	Win%	Loss%	Draw%	First	Last
Australia	13	1	4	8	7.69	30.76	61.53	1948	1996
England	23	0	6	17	0.00	26.08	73.91	1935	2004
India	6	0	0	6	0.00	0.00	100.00	1977	2003
South Africa	3	1	0	2	33.33	0.00	66.66	1972	1972
Total	45	2	10	33	4.44	22.22	73.33	1935	2004

== One Day International ==
New Zealand women One Day International record by opponent
Opponent	M	W	L	T	NR	Win%	First	Last
Australia	132	31	99	0	2	23.84	1973	2021
Denmark	1	1	0	0	0	100.00	1993	1993
England	73	35	36	1	1	49.30	1973	2021
India	48	28	19	1	0	59.37	1978	2019
International XI	4	3	1	0	0	75.00	1973	1982
Ireland	20	18	0	0	2	100.00	1988	2018
Netherlands	9	9	0	0	0	100.00	1984	2002
Pakistan	13	12	1	0	0	92.30	1997	2017
South Africa	16	11	5	0	0	68.75	1999	2020
Sri Lanka	10	10	0	0	0	100.00	1997	2017
Trinidad and Tobago	1	1	0	0	0	100.00	1973	1973
West Indies	19	11	7	0	1	61.11	1993	2018
Young England	1	1	0	0	0	100.00	1973	1973
Total	347	171	168	2	6	50.43	1973	2021

== Twenty20 International ==
New Zealand women Twenty20 International record by opponent
Opponent	M	W	L	T	Tie+W	Tie+L	NR	Win%	First	Last
Australia	46	21	23	0	0	1	1	47.77	2006	2021
Bangladesh	1	1	0	0	0	0	0	100.00	2020	2020
England	25	5	20	0	0	0	0	20.00	2004	2021
India	12	8	4	0	0	0	0	66.66	2009	2020
Ireland	4	4	0	0	0	0	0	100.00	2014	2018
Pakistan	8	8	0	0	0	0	0	100.00	2010	2018
South Africa	11	9	2	0	0	0	0	81.81	2007	2020
Sri Lanka	8	8	0	0	0	0	0	100.00	2010	2020
West Indies	18	12	4	0	1	0	1	73.52	2009	2018
Total	133	76	53	0	1	1	2	58.77	2004	2021

== See also ==
- New Zealand national cricket team record by opponent
