= ANZCA =

ANZCA may refer to:

- Australian and New Zealand College of Anaesthetists
- Australian and New Zealand Cultural Arts
