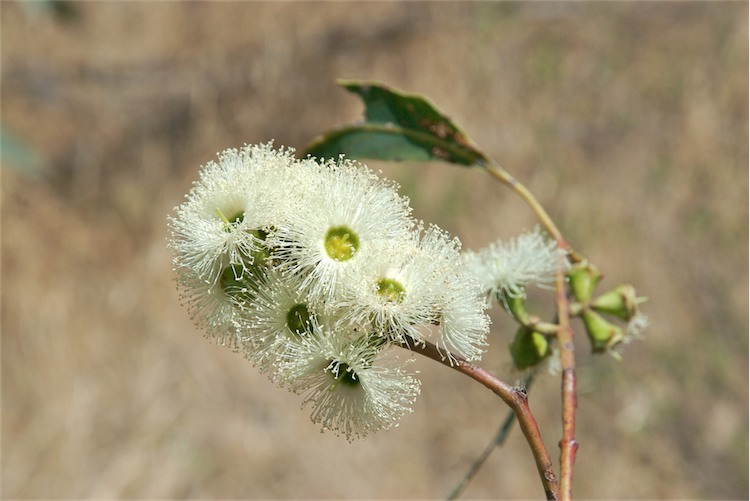
- Flowers of Eucalyptus tetrodonta

Scientific classification
- Kingdom: Plantae
- Clade: Tracheophytes
- Clade: Angiosperms
- Clade: Eudicots
- Clade: Rosids
- Order: Myrtales
- Family: Myrtaceae
- Genus: Eucalyptus
- Species: E. tetrodonta

Binomial name
- Eucalyptus tetrodonta F.Muell.

= Eucalyptus tetrodonta =

Darwin stringybark

Species of eucalyptus

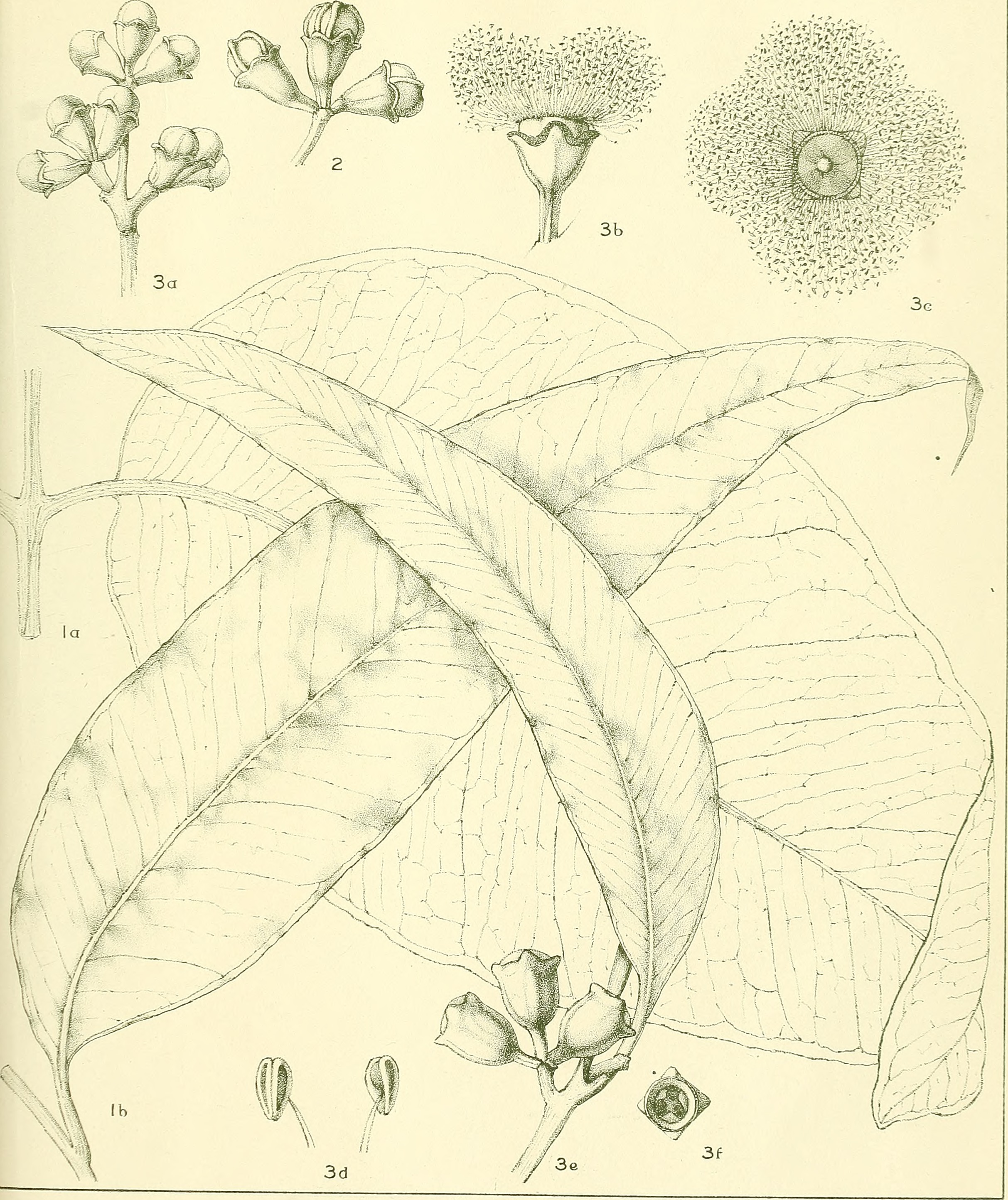
Illustration from Maiden's A Critical Revision of the Genus Eucalyptus

Eucalyptus tetrodonta, commonly known as Darwin stringybark or messmate, and known to the Yolngu peoples of Arnhem Land as gaḏayka, meaning "the word" or "message", is a species of medium-sized to tall tree that is endemic to northern Australia. It has rough, stringy or fibrous bark on the trunk and branches, lance-shaped leaves arranged in opposite pairs, flowers buds in groups of three, whitish to cream-coloured flowers and cylindrical fruit.

== Description ==
Eucalyptus tetrodonta is a tree that typically grows to a height of 9–25 m (30–82 ft) and forms a lignotuber. It has rough, fibrous or stringy, grey over reddish brown bark on the trunk and branches. Young plants and coppice regrowth have egg-shaped to broadly lance-shaped leaves that are the same shade of dull bluish green on both sides, arranged in opposite pairs, 150–350 mm (5.9–13.8 in) long and 35–120 mm (1.4–4.7 in) wide. Adult leaves are arranged in opposite pairs, the same shade of dull bluish green on both sides, lance-shaped to broadly lance-shaped or curved, 90–240 mm (3.5–9.4 in) long and 10–35 mm (0.39–1.38 in) wide, tapering to a petiole 11–26 mm (0.43–1.02 in) long. The flower buds are arranged in leaf axils in groups of three on an unbranched peduncle 3–17 mm (0.12–0.67 in) long, the individual buds on pedicels up to 9 mm (0.35 in) long. Mature buds are oval to pear-shaped, 8–13 mm (0.31–0.51 in) long and 6–12 mm (0.24–0.47 in) wide with a rounded operculum. Sometimes there are four ribs on the sides of the operculum. Flowering occurs between June and September and the flowers are whitish or cream-coloured. The fruit is a woody, cylindrical capsule 12–20 mm (0.47–0.79 in) long and 9–17 mm (0.35–0.67 in) wide with a vertically descending disc and three or four valves at rim level. The seeds are grey, flattened oval and 2–4 mm (0.079–0.157 in) long.

== Taxonomy and naming ==
Eucalyptus tetrodonta was first formally described by the botanist Ferdinand von Mueller in 1859 in Journal of the Proceedings of the Linnean Society, Botany. The specific epithet is derived from the ancient Greek words meaning "four" and "a tooth", in reference to the four teeth sometimes found around the rim of the fruit. The closest relative of this tree is E. megasepala.

A paper published in the journal Australasian Plant Pathology, apparently spelt this species' name as Eucalyptus tetradonta.

== Distribution and habitat ==
The Darwin stringybark is found on flats and plateaus in the Kimberley region of Western Australia region where it grows on flat areas and plateaus in sandy soils over laterite, sandstone or quartzite. The range extends eastward across the Top End of the Northern Territory and parts of the Gulf of Carpentaria and Cape York regions in North Queensland. It is usually a part of open forest or woodland communities.

== Conservation status ==
This eucalypt is classified as "not threatened" by the Western Australian Government Department of Parks and Wildlife, as "least concern" under the Northern Territory Government Territory Parks and Wildlife Conservation Act 2000 and as "least concern" under the Queensland Government Nature Conservation Act 1992.

== Uses ==
Yolngu peoples use various types of stringybark for painting on, including Eucalyptus tetradonta, which is known as gaḏayka, meaning "the word" or "message". The bark of this stringybark was used to create the Yirrkala bark petitions, which were presented to the Australian Parliament in 1963.

== See also ==
- List of Eucalyptus species
