= Journal of Medical Imaging and Radiation Oncology =

- Discipline: Radiology, Radiation oncology, Nuclear medicine, Interventional Radiology, Interventional Neuroradiology
- Language: English
- Edited by: Warren Clements

Publication details
- Former name: Australasian Radiology
- History: 1957–present
- Publisher: Wiley-Blackwell
- Frequency: Bimonthly
- Open access: Hybrid
- Impact factor: 1.5 (2025)

Standard abbreviations
- ISO 4: J. Med. Imaging Radiat. Oncol.

Indexing
- ISSN: 1754-9485
- OCLC no.: 216928638

Links
- Journal homepage

Journal of Medical Imaging and Radiation Oncology (formerly: Australasian Radiology; print: ISSN 1754-9477, online: ISSN 1754-9485) is the official journal of the Royal Australian and New Zealand College of Radiologists. It is a bimonthly medical journal covering radiological practice and research in Australasia. It is published by Wiley-Blackwell and was established in 1957.

According to the Journal Citation Reports, its 2025 impact factor was 1.5, while according to Scopus, it received a 2025 CiteScore of 3. In 2025, the journal had a 17% acceptance rate and the median time from submission to first decision was 14 days.

Editor History

Dr. James Ryan (1957-1987) Served as the founding Honorary Editor of Australasian Radiology and shepherded the journal through its first three decades.

Prof. John Palmer (1987-1999) Took over from Dr. Ryan and modernised the journal's publication format with Blackwell Science.

Prof. Michael Sage (1999-2007) Managed the transition into the early digital era, including indexing on MEDLINE and Ovid.

Prof. David Ball (2007-2022) Overseeing the historic official name change from Australasian Radiology to JMIRO in 2008, as well as transitioning the journal into a modern digital manuscript management workflow.

Prof. Michael Barton (2022-2024) Managed expansion of radiation oncology content.

Dr. Gabriel "Gabes" Lau (2024-2026) Overseeing JMIRO's complete transition from a traditional print format to a 100% digital publication.

Prof. Warren Clements (2026-current) Current editor of JMIRO.
