= Australasian Journal of Educational Technology =

- Discipline: Educational technology
- Language: English
- Edited by: Michael Henderson, Eva Heinrich, Petrea Redmond

Publication details
- Former name: Australian Journal of Educational Technology
- History: 1985–present
- Publisher: Australasian Society for Computers in Learning in Tertiary Education (Australia)
- Frequency: Bimonthly
- Open access: Yes
- Impact factor: 1.171 (2015)

Standard abbreviations
- ISO 4: Australas. J. Educ. Technol.

Indexing
- ISSN: 1449-5554
- OCLC no.: 231995714

Links
- Journal homepage

The Australasian Journal of Educational Technology is a peer-reviewed academic journal covering research in educational technology, instructional design, online and e-learning, educational design, multimedia, computer assisted learning, and related areas. It is published in 8 issues per year by the Australasian Society for Computers in Learning in Tertiary Education (ASCILITE) as an open access online-only journal. All previous issues, dating from 1985, are accessible online without charges.

== History ==
The Australasian Journal of Educational Technology was established as the Australian Journal of Educational Technology by the Australian Society for Educational Technology (ASET) in 1985, with two issues per year. From 1997 to 2005, the journal was published jointly by ASCILITE and ASET, and from 2006 by ASCILITE. Publication frequency increased to three issues in 1999, to four issues in 2005, and to six issues in 2010. From 2004, the journal carried a new title containing Australasian instead of Australian, in order to align it with its main sponsor, ASCILITE, and to make it more inclusive to authors from nearby countries.

In 2007, the journal merged with the International Journal of Educational Technology (ISSN 1327-7308), an online-only open access peer-reviewed journal that had been sponsored jointly by the University of Western Australia and the University of Illinois at Urbana–Champaign and that published five issues from 1999 to 2002. Its back issues are available on the website of the merged journal and copyright in all papers was restored to their original authors as part of the merger.

In 2008, the journal merged with the Journal of Instructional Science and Technology, whose archives are also available on the merged journal's website.
