= Redemptorists of Australia and New Zealand =

The Redemptorists of Australia and New Zealand are a province within The Congregation of the Most Holy Redeemer (Latin: Congregatio Sanctissimi Redemptoris – C.Ss.R or CSSR). The Congregation of the Most Holy Redeemer is a Roman Catholic missionary order which was created in 1732 by Saint Alphonsus Liguori at Scala, near Amalfi, Italy for the purpose of labouring among the neglected country people in the neighbourhood of Naples.

Members of the order are known as Redemptorists. Priests and brothers work in more than 77 countries around the world.

== History in Australia and New Zealand ==
A number of requests for Australian foundations had been made to the Redemptorists by Bishop James Murray of Maitland and in 1881, the English Province answered the call. A small team was formed to be the first Australian community and in January 1882, they were given a farewell dinner before they set sail; Cardinal Manning arrived with good wishes. The next day the group boarded the liner Sorata bound for Australia, bringing with them an icon of Our Lady of Perpetual Help, blessed by Pope Leo XIII. Eight weeks later, on their arrival in Sydney, the then Archbishop Roger Bede Vaughan, welcomed them.

The leader of the group was Fr Edmund Vaughan, C.Ss.R. He was born in 1827 and was now 53 years of age. On their arrival in Sydney, the then Archbishop was Fr Vaughan's nephew, the Benedictine, Roger Bede Vaughan, who welcomed them with largesse. On board with Fr Vaughan were two Irishmen, Fr Thomas O’Farrell and Fr James Hegarty, who would eventually take the Redemptorists to the Philippines.

The Redemptorists set up their first house in Singleton, New South Wales where the hot climate forced them to conduct summer missions in the cooler climate of New Zealand's Dioceses.

The Order soon took up residence in a new monastery at Mount St Alphonsus, Waratah, in Newcastle. In the first year at Waratah the community conducted 45 missions in ten dioceses through New South Wales, Victoria and South Australia. The Redemptorists soon opened another Monastery in Ballarat 1888, serving as a base for missions in the southern states. With the Ballarat community taking caring for the south of Australia, the community at Waratah began to look the north.

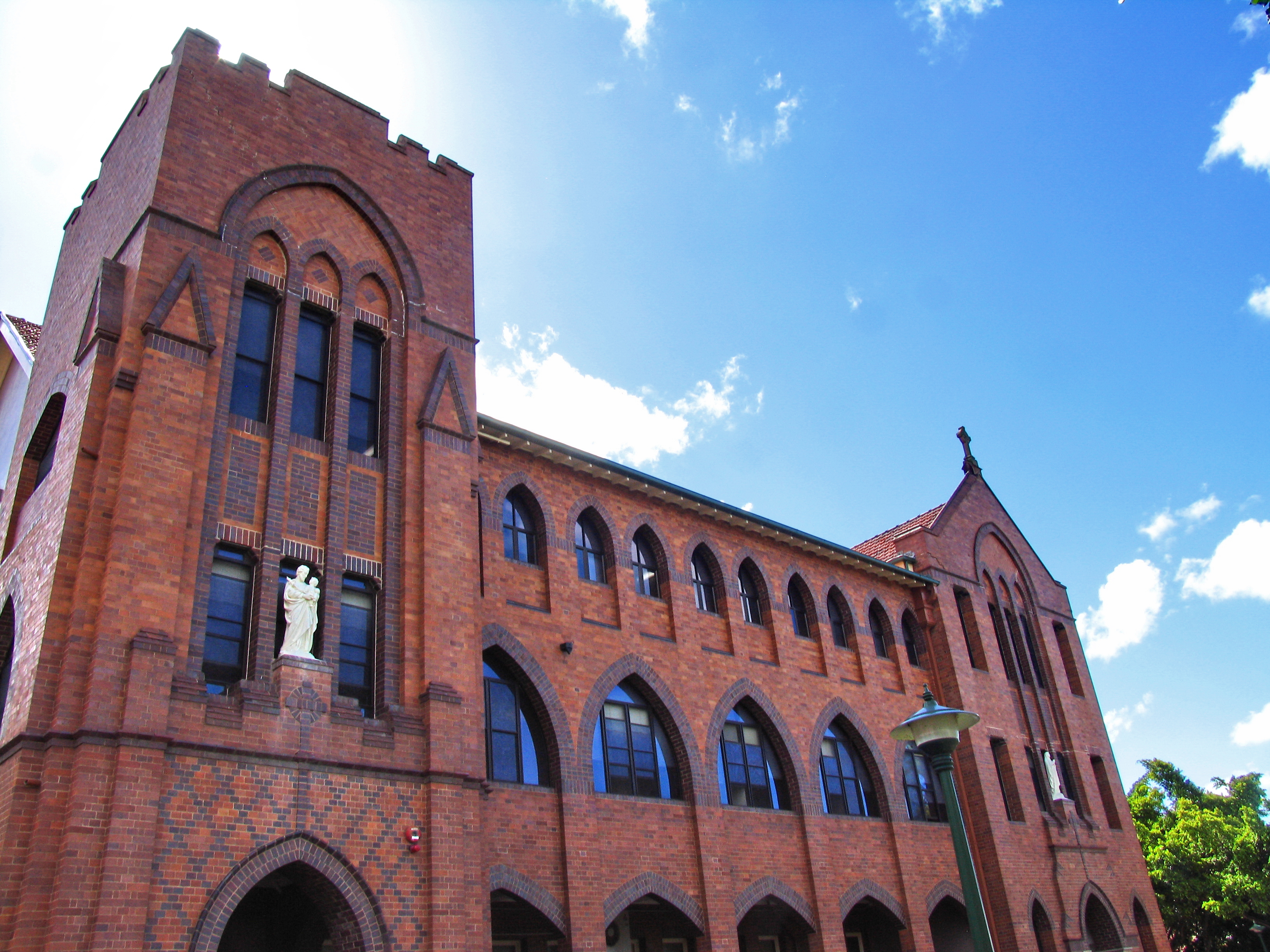
Former Redemptorist Monastery of St Joseph, 46-60 Church Road, Mitchelton, Brisbane, 2007, now part of the Oxford Park retirement village

In 1889, the first missions were preached in Queensland. Missions began in Brisbane and its surrounding area, with their success convincing the Archbishop to extend the programme to the far flung country parishes.

Once the Redemptorists were firmly established in Australia, permanent communities were founded in New Zealand. A Redemptorist mission in Canterbury scaled its operations down in the 1880s, leaving just two priests in Lyttelton. In 1898 the Redemptorists began operating from a homestead in Wellington where they worked for over 80 years. A church was built there in 1908, and expanded to form St Gerard's Monastery in 1931–1932.

In 1898 the houses in Ireland and Australia, hitherto subject to the English province, were constituted an Irish province, and Australia, a vice-province, as its dependency. In October 1898 the Redemptorists conducted a month-long mission in Perth. The mission was so well received that requests for further missions followed. This led to the construction of the monastery in North Perth which was blessed and opened in September 1903. One of the first Superiors was Dr. Patrick Clune, born in Clare, Ireland, 1863, who had been ordained in the Diocese of Goulburn in 1886 and had previously been rector of the Redemptorist monastery in Wellington, New Zealand. He would later become the first bishop of the Roman Catholic diocese of Perth.

A Novitiate and House of Studies were built at Pennant Hills in Sydney, New South Wales, in 1924 to cater for the increased numbers of men wanting to join the Redemptorists. The Novitiate later moved to Galong, also in New South Wales. In 1935 a second Victorian house was opened at Kew, Melbourne. A new house was created in Christchurch, New Zealand in 1945, followed by other foundations in Auckland and Dunedin

In 1927, The Redemptorist leaders in Rome created the Province of Australasia to include the houses of Australia and New Zealand. New Zealand became an independent Province in 1970.

Post-war Redemptorist activities include the development of the vice-provinces in the Philippines and in Singapore/Malaysia, the creation of several new houses on the east coast of Australia. The Redemptorists also became active as professors at Yarra Theological college.

The Redemptorists still are engaged in missionary activity in Australia and New Zealand. Redemptorists are actively involved in parish missions, preaching, retreats, adult education, teaching in universities, social justice work, counselling, accompaniment of indigenous communities, chaplaincies, devotions to Our Lady of Perpetual Help, working with people on the margins of society and promoting the family through the Majellan magazine.

On January 1, 2015 the Redemptorists of Oceania living in New Zealand, Australia and Samoa became the new Redemptorist Province of Oceania with two vice provinces of Manila (Philippines) and Ipoh (Singapore/Malaysia) which both started as missions from Australia and New Zealand in the twentieth century.
