= Australasian Law Teachers Association =

The Australasian Law Teachers Association (ALTA) was a professional body representing the interests of law teachers in Australia, New Zealand and the South Pacific. Its aim is to promote excellence in legal academic teaching and research with particular emphasis on early career academics, throughout the Australasia.

In 2019, ALTA became ALAA - the Australasian Law Academics' Association.

In 2020, ALAA entered into a memorandum of understanding with the Council of Australian Law Deans reflecting their relationship.

== Activities ==
(a) Legal research and scholarship;

(b) Curriculum advancement of pedagogical improvements in view of national and international developments, including law reform;

(c) Government policies and practices that relate to legal education and research;

(d) Professional development opportunities for legal academics;

(e) Professional legal education and practices programs.

Membership is open to teachers of law and law librarians in tertiary institutions in the above countries.

ALAA supports the endeavours of law academics, in particular around legal education, legal research and career development. Members have the opportunity to join interest groups which put them in touch with other academics in their field(s). Since 2022, ALAA has run an early career academic program, hosting meetings twice a year to promote professional development for early career academics.

== Annual Conferences ==
ALTA holds an Annual Conference which is held at a different law school each year. Previous Conferences have been hosted by:

- University of Queensland (2025)
- Flinders University (2024)
- University of Canterbury, New Zealand (2023)
- Monash University (2022)
- University of Sydney and University of Technology Sydney (2021)
- Southern Cross University (2019)
- Curtin University (2018)
- University of South Australia (2017)
- Victoria University of Wellington (2016)
- LaTrobe University (2015)
- Bond University (2014)
- Australian National University (2013)
- Faculty of Law, The University of Sydney (2012)
- Queensland University of Technology in Brisbane (2011)
- The University of Auckland (2010)
- The University of Western Sydney (2009)
- James Cook University (2008)
- The University of Western Australia (2007)
- Victoria University (2006)
- The University of Waikato (2005)
- Charles Darwin University in 2004

The Conference provides a supportive environment for academics to present papers on their areas of research, and is also a place to develop networks and friendships with other academics within Australasia.

== Awards conferred ==
Over decades, the annual conference has featured a number of awards including the LexisNexis - Australasian Law Teachers Association Award for Excellence and Innovation in the Teaching of Law as well as the CCH-ALTA Best Conference Paper Awards which included a Major Category Award, Early Career Award and Best Paper presented in the Legal Education Interest Group Award.

More recently, the annual conference features the announcement of the Australian Legal Education Awards, sponsored by the Council of Australian Law Deans and Legal Education Associate Deans Network. Awards include:

- excellence in teaching
- excellence in teaching (early career)
- excellence in teaching (engagement)
- excellence in research supervision
- outstanding career achievement award

== Publications ==
Publications of the association are held in numerous libraries in Australia.

Legal Education Review: ALAA's own legal education publication is published on a rolling basis, in open access.

Journal of the Australasian Law Academics Association (formerly Journal of the Australasian Law Teachers Association): ALAA's journal containing diverse areas of legal research is a collection of published ALAA conference papers. The papers can cover any topic and are double-blind refereed before being accepted for publication in the journal.

Legal Education Digest (in hiatus as at 2025): Publication of the Centre for Legal Education, UTS, was published tri-annually and comprised a review of articles and other publications which focused on Legal Education. Over 200 journals, including working papers and research monographs, were kept under review.

ALTA Newsletter (retired): Published bi-annually and includes an update on what is happening at ALTA, as well as conference and publication updates and other articles of interest.
