= Interventional Neuroradiology =

- Language: English

Publication details
- History: 1995–present
- Publisher: Mary Ann Liebert
- Frequency: Bimonthly
- Impact factor: 2.1 (2024)

Standard abbreviations
- ISO 4: Interv. Neuroradiol.

Indexing
- ISSN: 1591-0199 (print); 2385-2011 (web)
- OCLC no.: 429188750

Links
- Journal homepage; Online access; Online archive

Interventional Neuroradiology is a bimonthly peer-reviewed medical journal covering neuroradiology. It was established in 1995 and is published by Mary Ann Liebert. According to the Journal Citation Reports, the journal has a 2024 impact factor of 2.1.
