= Australasian Plant Pathology Society =

Scientific association in Australia, New Zealand and Papua New Guinea

- Formation: 1969; 57 years ago
- Region served: Australasia
- Fields: Plant pathology
- Publication: Australasian Plant Pathology; Australasian Plant Disease Notes
- Affiliations: International Society for Plant Pathology
- Website: Official website

The Australasian Plant Pathology Society (APPS) is a scientific association whose members study plant diseases. Its members are located in Australia, New Zealand and Papua New Guinea, and also the Indian, Pacific and Asian regions. The society was founded in 1969.

As part of their membership in APPS, members are also associate members of the International Society for Plant Pathology.

The society holds biennial conferences rotated throughout its eleven regions. The 2025 APPS conference was held in Sydney, Australia.

== Awards and prizes ==
- Peter Williamson Award for Distinguished Service
- Fellow of the Australasian Plant Pathology Society
- Lester Burgess Award for Diagnostics and Extension or Research Communication
- Allen Kerr Postgraduate Prize

== Journals ==
The official journals of the society, Australasian Plant Pathology and Australasian Plant Disease Notes, are published by Springer Nature.

== See also ==
- British Society for Plant Pathology
- Plant Pathology (journal)
