= Royal Australian and New Zealand College of Radiologists =

Professional organization for radiologists

The Royal Australian and New Zealand College of Radiologists
- Abbreviation: RANZCR
- Formation: 1935; 91 years ago
- Headquarters: Sydney CBD, New South Wales, Australia
- Region served: Australia; New Zealand
- President: Professor John Slavotinek
- Dean, Faculty of Clinical Radiology: Dr Rajiv Rattan
- Dean, Faculty of Radiation Oncology: Dr Tuan Ha
- Chair, New Zealand Branch: Dr Jash Agraval
- Website: www.ranzcr.com
- Formerly called: Australian and New Zealand Association of Radiology; Australian and New Zealand Association of Radiologists; The College of Radiologists (Australia & New Zealand); The Royal Australasian College of Radiologists

The Royal Australian and New Zealand College of Radiologists (RANZCR) is the leading professional organisation for the promotion of the science and practice of the medical specialties of clinical radiology (diagnostic and interventional radiology) and radiation oncology in Australia and New Zealand. The college has members throughout the world. RANZCR provides the educational curricula for medical graduates training to enter the specialties.

RANZCR is independent of universities and is scrutinised and externally accredited against industry standards by the Australian Medical Council (AMC).

The official journal of the college is the Journal of Medical Imaging and Radiation Oncology.

== History ==
Very soon after the discovery of X-rays in 1895, and radium in 1896, members of the fledgling specialties of radiology and radiation therapy had begun practising across Australia and New Zealand.

In 1935, the Australian and New Zealand Association of Radiology was formed, with the purposes of setting minimum standards of training and conduct, stimulating interest in research, and otherwise enhancing the prestige and professionalism of the specialties. The Association was the third professional medical body to be formed in Australia.80 Year Anniversary

In 1949 the Association became the College of Radiologists (Australia and New Zealand). Further name changes followed in 1952 (College of Radiologists of Australasia), 1972 (Royal Australasian College of Radiologists) and 1997 (The Royal Australian and New Zealand College of Radiologists).

The RANZCR head office was for many years located in rooms on Macquarie Street, Sydney. Larger premises were purchased in Lower Fort Street, the Rocks, Sydney, in 1977 where the college head office remained until its move to 51 Druitt Street, Sydney, in 1997. The college's New Zealand offices are located in Wellington.

RANZCR remains the peak body in Australia and New Zealand for practitioners of clinical radiology and radiation oncology, and continues to pursue the purposes of excellence in training, research and medical professionalism.

=== Armorial Bearings ===
Following earlier enquiries to the Portcullis Pursuivant of Arms, the RANZCR Council submitted the relevant documentation (numbers of Fellows, Members, Associates and Life Members, relevant Memoranda and Article) and £365 fee to the College of Arms in 1963.

The following symbols are incorporated in the RANZCR crest:

- Colours reflect those used for gowns worn by members and the President
- The cross in the centre of the shield represents X-rays
- The stars on the shield signify the Southern Cross to indicate the Australasian location
- The flaming torch represents learning and research
- The crown composed of rays and upraised skeletal arm represent diagnostic radiology
- A griffin as one supporter is depicted with rays emanating from its body to represent therapeutic radiation oncology
- A lynx as the other supporter as it was considered by the Ancients to have eyesight so powerful it could see through solid objects
- A silver fern and wattle around the necks of the lynx and griffin representing New Zealand and Australia.

The Coat of Arms was granted by Queen Elizabeth II on 2 September 1964.

=== Motto ===
Members were asked to suggest a motto. Latin: Lumen Afferimus Morbis (We Cast Light on Disease), suggested by Dr Colin Macdonald, was selected but not without protest regarding the accuracy of the Latin. Advice from the College of Arms and also Prof. A. J. Dunston, Professor of Latin at the University of Sydney, was that the suggested motto was in order and suitable.

=== Royal prefix ===
Permission to use the ‘Royal’ prefix, first applied for in 1967 but rejected by the then Prime Minister, RG Menzies, was granted in September 1971 by W McMahon. On 28 July 1972, the Australasian College of Radiologists became ‘The Royal Australasian College of Radiologists’.

== Governance ==
RANZCR is led by clinicians who are democratically elected by the membership. The ultimate oversight and responsibility is vested in the RANZCR board of directors.

=== Presidents ===
The following individuals have served as president of The Royal Australian and New Zealand College of Radiologists, or any precedent name of the college:

Presidents of The Royal Australian and New Zealand College of Radiologists
Ordinal	Officeholder	College name	States / territories / country of origin	Term
1	Dr A. T. Nisbet	Australian and New Zealand Association of Radiology	NSW	1935–1942
1	Dr A. T. Nisbet	Australian and New Zealand Association of Radiologists	NSW	1942–1947
2	Dr V. McDowall	Australian and New Zealand Association of Radiologists	QLD	1947–1948
3	Dr J. O’Sullivan	Australian and New Zealand Association of Radiologists	VIC	1948–1949
4	Dr W. P. Holman	Australian and New Zealand Association of Radiologists	TAS	1949
5	Dr J. S. Verco	The College of Radiologists (Australia & New Zealand)	SA	1949–1950
(4)	Dr W. P. Holman	The College of Radiologists (Australia & New Zealand)	TAS	1950–1951
6	Dr H. R. Sear	The College of Radiologists (Australia & New Zealand)	NSW	1951–1952
7	Dr C. C. Anderson	The College of Radiologists of Australasia	NZ	1952–1953
8	Dr A. R. Colwell	The College of Radiologists of Australasia	NSW	1953–1954
9	Dr B. L. W. Clarke	The College of Radiologists of Australasia	QLD	1954–1955
10	Dr D. G. Maitland	The College of Radiologists of Australasia	NSW	1955–1956
11	Dr E. W. Casey	The College of Radiologists of Australasia	VIC	1955–1956
12	Dr M. G. F. Donnan	The College of Radiologists of Australasia	VIC	1956–1957
13	Dr R. Kaye Scott	The College of Radiologists of Australasia	VIC	1958–1959
14	Dr C. D. Costello	The College of Radiologists of Australasia	NZ	1959–1960
15	Dr H. J. Ham	The College of Radiologists of Australasia	NSW	1960–1961
16	Dr B. S. Hanson	The College of Radiologists of Australasia	SA	1961–1962
17	Dr E. R. Crisp	The College of Radiologists of Australasia	VIC	1962–1963
18	Dr K. J. Friend	The College of Radiologists of Australasia	TAS	1963–1964
18	Dr E. A. Booth	The College of Radiologists of Australasia	NSW	1964–1965
19	Dr A. G. S. Cooper	The College of Radiologists of Australasia	QLD	1965–1966
20	Dr C. R. Laing	The College of Radiologists of Australasia	VIC	1966–1967
21	Dr E. P. Allen	The College of Radiologists of Australasia	NZ	1967–1968
22	Dr D. B. Wightman	The College of Radiologists of Australasia	NSW	1968–1970
23	Dr A. A. Merritt	The College of Radiologists of Australasia	WA	1970–1971
24	Major General C. M. Gurner	The College of Radiologists of Australasia	ACT	1971–1972
25	Dr F. A. Dibden	The Royal Australasian College of Radiologists	SA	1972–1973
26	Dr B. E. Frecker	The Royal Australasian College of Radiologists	NSW	1973–1974
27	Dr D. E. Urquhart	The Royal Australasian College of Radiologists	NZ	1974–1975
28	Dr J. K. Monk	The Royal Australasian College of Radiologists	VIC	1975–1976
29	Dr T. P. Loneragan	The Royal Australasian College of Radiologists	NSW	1976–1977
30	Dr J. P. Masel	The Royal Australasian College of Radiologists	QLD	1977–1978
31	Dr J. D. Cashman	The Royal Australasian College of Radiologists	NSW	1978–1979
32	Dr D. L. Dixon	The Royal Australasian College of Radiologists	VIC	1979–1980
33	Dr P. Beridahl	The Royal Australasian College of Radiologists	WA	1980–1981
34	Dr T. S. Weston	The Royal Australasian College of Radiologists	NZ	1981–1982
35	Dr T. F. Sandeman	The Royal Australasian College of Radiologists	VIC	1982–1983
36	Dr P. W. Verco	The Royal Australasian College of Radiologists	SA	1983–1984
37	Dr G. Pinner^{[note a]}	The Royal Australasian College of Radiologists	ACT	1984–1985
38	Dr F. Schubert	The Royal Australasian College of Radiologists	QLD	1985–1986
39	Professor W. S. C. Hare	The Royal Australasian College of Radiologists	VIC	1986–1987
40	Dr P. Grattan-Smith	The Royal Australasian College of Radiologists	NSW	1987–1988
41	Dr G. W. Dodd	The Royal Australasian College of Radiologists	NZ	1988–1989
42	Dr J. Syme	The Royal Australasian College of Radiologists	VIC	1989–1990
43	Dr H. T. ApSimon	The Royal Australasian College of Radiologists	WA	1990–1991
44	Dr A. R. Robertson	The Royal Australasian College of Radiologists	SA	1991–1992
45	Professor R. G. Bourne	The Royal Australasian College of Radiologists	QLD	1992–1993
46	Dr R. J. Glasson	The Royal Australasian College of Radiologists	NSW	1993–1994
47	Dr J. C. Kennedy	The Royal Australasian College of Radiologists	NZ	1994–1995
48	Dr G. Klempfner	The Royal Australasian College of Radiologists	VIC	1995–1996
49	Associate Professor T. M. Chakera	The Royal Australasian College of Radiologists	WA	1996–1997
50	Professor M. R. Sage	The Royal Australasian College of Radiologists	SA	1997–1998
51	Associate Professor W. J. S. Earwaker	The Royal Australian and New Zealand College of Radiologists	QLD	1998–1999
52	Dr B. K. Moore	The Royal Australian and New Zealand College of Radiologists	QLD	2000–2001
53	Dr P. L. Sprague	The Royal Australian and New Zealand College of Radiologists	WA	2002–2003
54	Associate Professor L. S. Lau	The Royal Australian and New Zealand College of Radiologists	VIC	2004
55	Dr L. M. Kenny^{[note a]}	The Royal Australian and New Zealand College of Radiologists	QLD	2005–2007
56	Professor M. S. Khangure	The Royal Australian and New Zealand College of Radiologists	WA	2008–2009
57	Dr M. W. Andrews	The Royal Australian and New Zealand College of Radiologists	VIC	2010–2011
58	Associate Professor D. K. Varma	The Royal Australian and New Zealand College of Radiologists	VIC	2012–2013
59	Associate Professor C. Milross	The Royal Australian and New Zealand College of Radiologists	NSW	2014–2015
60	Dr G. J. Slater	The Royal Australian and New Zealand College of Radiologists	QLD	2016–2017
61	Dr Lance Lawler	The Royal Australian and New Zealand College of Radiologists	NSW	2018–incumbent

^[note a]: Female presidents

== Structure ==
RANZCR has two faculties: the Faculty of Clinical Radiology (established 2013) and the Faculty of Radiation Oncology (established 1994).

=== Membership ===
As of 31 December 2016, RANZCR had 3515 active members, including 2467 clinical radiologists, 421 radiation oncologists, and 627 trainees.

There are six categories of membership, each with their own particular rights, entitlements and responsibilities as prescribed in the RANZCR's Articles of Association:

- Fellows
- Life Members
- Honorary Fellows
- Associate Members
- Student Members
- Educational Affiliate Members

== Training ==
RANZCR is responsible for the training of clinical radiologists and radiation oncologists in Australia and New Zealand. Training, under the auspices of RANZCR, can also be undertaken in Singapore.

Following a 1998 Australian Medical Council (AMC) undertaking to review all specialist medical training programs in Australia, RANZCR volunteered to be one of two medical colleges to undertake a review of their training programs. This 2004 review identified that a more structured approach to the training program assessment, including a formal curriculum, was required.

Curricula were developed for each of the radiation oncology and clinical radiology training programs, launched in 2008 and 2009 respectively. These curricula follow key educational principles:

- Explicit curriculum reflecting the goals and philosophy of the program
- Clearly defined syllabus and learning objectives
- Well-structured rotational training system
- Transparent, accountable, and appropriate assessment processes
- Broad and relevant assessment of all aspects of trainee competency

Following successful completion of training, graduates are awarded Fellowship of The Royal Australian and New Zealand College of Radiologists (FRANZCR).

Specialist medical registration with the Medical Board of Australia “is available to medical practitioners who have been assessed by an AMC accredited specialist college as being eligible for fellowship.”

Clinical radiology Fellows and trainees are able to undertake further sub-specialty study in nuclear medicine through the combined Royal Australasian College of Physicians (RACP)/RANZCR nuclear medicine training program.
