= New Zealand national cricket team record by opponent =

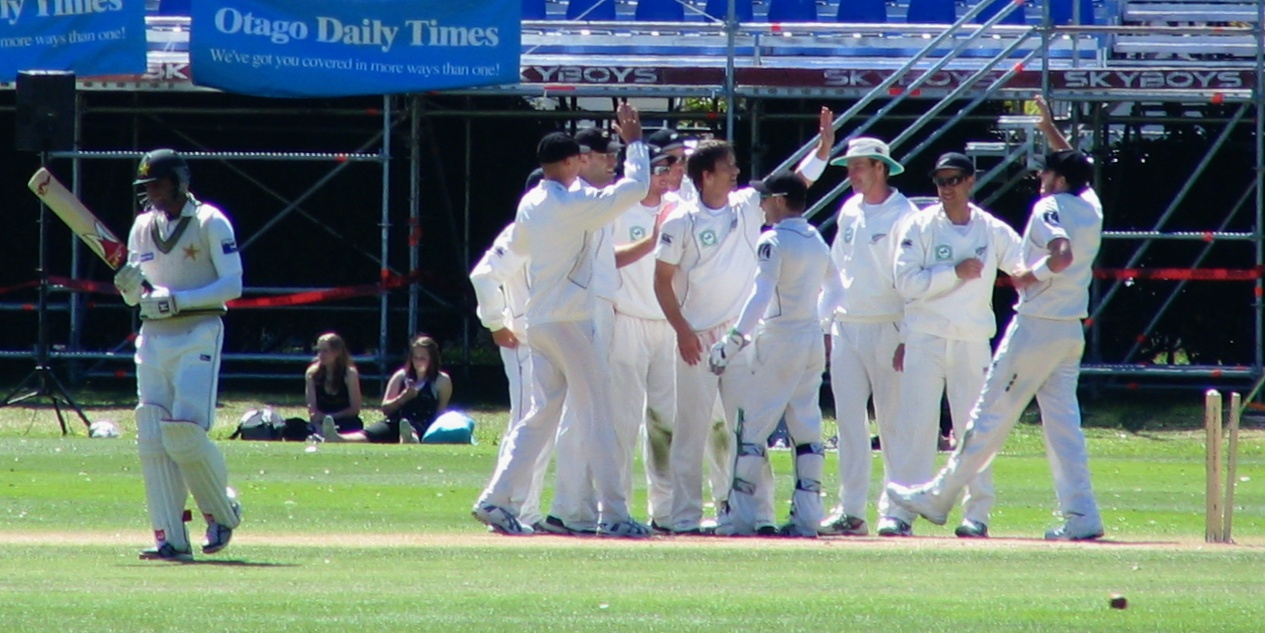
The New Zealand team celebrating a dismissal in 2009

The New Zealand national cricket team represents New Zealand in international cricket and is a full member of the International Cricket Council (ICC) with Test, One Day International (ODI) and T20I status. They played their first Test in 1930 against England in Christchurch, New Zealand, becoming the fifth country to play Test cricket. It took the team 26 years until the 1955–56 season to win a Test match, when they defeated West Indies at Eden Park in Auckland. They played their first ODI in the 1972–73 season against Pakistan in Christchurch. They are the joint oldest nation with Australia to play first Twenty20 International in 2005.

New Zealand's win percentage in test cricket is 25.46%. As of December 2025, New Zealand have played 483 Test matches; out of which they have won 123, lost 189, while 171 matches have ended as draw.

New Zealand is also one of the most successful ODI teams with a win percentage of 49.75% and have reached many tournament's semi-finals. As of January 2026, they have played 850 ODI matches, out of which they have won 398, lost 401; 7 matches have ended as a tie, whilst 44 had no result. They have reached six semi-finals at Cricket World Cup which is more than any other, in 1975, 1979, 1992, 1999, 2007, and 2011. New Zealand's best performance in world cups came in 2015 and 2019 when they ended as runners-up. In ICC Champions Trophy, New Zealand became champions in 2000. They were also the runners up in ICC Champions Trophy 2009 and semi-finalists in ICC Champions Trophy 2006 as well.

New Zealand has shown average performances in Twenty20 Internationals. As of November 2025, New Zealand have played 246 T20I matches and won 126 of them, lost 99, 10 matches ended as a tie whilst 11 matches yielded no result. Their win percentage is 54.68 During 6 ICC World Twenty20 tournaments, New Zealand's best performance came during 2007 and 2016 where they finished as semi-finalists.

As of November 2025, New Zealand has faced nine teams in Test cricket, with their most frequent opponent is England; playing 115 matches against them. However, they have registered most wins against Sri Lanka that is 18 wins, but their best win percentage is 87% against Bangladesh, against whom they have won 14 out of 19 tests. In ODI matches, New Zealand have played against 18 teams; they have played against their continent rivals, Australia most frequently, with a winning percentage of 28.88 in 142 matches. Within usual major ODI nations, New Zealand have defeated Sri Lanka on 54 occasions, which is their best record in ODIs. The team has competed against 18 countries in T20IS.

== Test cricket ==
=== Matches played (by country) ===
Opponent	1st Test	Last Test	Matches	Won	Lost	Drawn	Tied	% Won
Afghanistan	–	–	0	0	0	0	0	–
Australia	29 March 1946	8 March 2024	62	8	36	18	0	12.90
Bangladesh	26 December 2001	6 December 2023	19	14	2	3	0	73.68
England	10 January 1930	14 December 2024	115	14	54	47	0	12.17
India	6 January 1956	1 November 2024	65	16	22	27	0	24.61
Ireland	–	–	0	0	0	0	0	–
Pakistan	7 November 1955	2 January 2023	62	14	25	23	0	22.58
South Africa	27 February 1932	13 February 2024	49	7	26	16	0	14.28
Sri Lanka	11 March 1983	26 September 2024	40	18	11	11	0	45.00
West Indies	8 February 1952	18 December 2025	52	19	13	20	0	36.53
Zimbabwe	7 November 1992	7 August 2025	19	13	0	6	0	68.42
Summary	1930	2025	483	123	189	171	0	25.46
Source: Cricinfo. Last updated: 22 December 2025

== One Day International ==
=== Matches played (by country) ===
Opponent	1st ODI	Last ODI	Matches	Won	Lost	Tied	No result	% Won
Afghanistan	8 March 2015	17 October 2023	3	3	0	0	0	100.00
Australia	30 March 1974	28 October 2023	142	39	96	0	7	28.88
Bangladesh	28 April 1990	24 February 2025	46	34	11	0	0	75.55
Canada	3 March 2003	13 March 2011	3	3	0	0	0	100.00
East Africa^{†}	7 June 1975		1	1	0	0	0	100.00
England	18 July 1973	1 November 2025	99	48	44	3	4	52.10
India	14 June 1975	18 January 2026	123	52	63	1	7	45.25
Ireland	1 July 2008	15 July 2022	7	7	0	0	0	100.00
Kenya	21 February 2003	20 February 2011	2	2	0	0	0	100.00
Netherlands	17 February 1996	9 October 2023	5	5	0	0	0	100.00
Pakistan	11 February 1973	5 April 2025	122	57	61	1	3	48.31
Scotland	31 May 1999	31 July 2022	4	4	0	0	0	100.00
South Africa	29 February 1992	5 March 2025	74	27	42	0	5	39.13
Sri Lanka	9 June 1979	11 Jan 2025	108	54	44	1	9	55.05
United Arab Emirates	27 February 1996		1	1	0	0	0	100.00
United States	10 September 2004		1	1	0	0	0	100.00
West Indies	18 June 1975	22 November 2025	71	33	31	0	7	51.56
Zimbabwe	10 October 1987	7 August 2015	38	27	9	1	1	74.32
Summary	1973	2026	850	398	401	7	44	49.75
Source: Cricinfo. Last updated: 18 January 2026

== Twenty20 International ==
=== Matches played (by country) ===
Opponent	1st T20I	Last T20I	Matches	Won	Lost	Tied	No result	Win %
Afghanistan	7 November 2021	8 June 2024	2	1	1	0	0	50.00
Australia	17 February 2005	4 October 2025	22	5	15	1	0	26.19
Bangladesh	3 February 2010	31 December 2023	20	15	4	0	0	78.94
England	18 September 2007	23 October 2025	30	10	16	1	3	38.88
India	16 September 2007	1 February 2023	25	10	12	3	0	46.00
Ireland	11 June 2009	4 November 2022	5	5	0	0	0	100.00
Kenya	12 September 2007		1	1	0	0	0	100.00
Namibia	5 November 2021		1	1	0	0	0	100.00
Netherlands	29 March 2014	5 August 2022	3	3	0	0	0	100.00
Pakistan	22 September 2007	26 March 2025	49	23	24	0	0	48.93
Papua New Guinea	17 June 2024		1	1	0	0	0	100.00
Scotland	6 June 2009	29 July 2022	4	4	0	0	0	100.00
South Africa	21 October 2005	26 July 2025	18	7	11	0	0	38.88
Sri Lanka	22 December 2006	2 January 2025	28	16	9	1	1	62.96
Uganda	14 June 2024		1	1	0	0	0	100.00
United Arab Emirates	17 August 2023	20 August 2023	3	2	1	0	0	66.67
West Indies	16 February 2006	13 November 2025	25	13	6	3	4	59.09
Zimbabwe	4 May 2010	24 July 2025	8	8	0	0	0	100.00
Summary	2005	2025	246	126	99	9	8	49.79
Source: Cricinfo. Last updated: 28 November 2025
