= Australia–New Zealand sports rivalries =

Sports rivalries between two countries

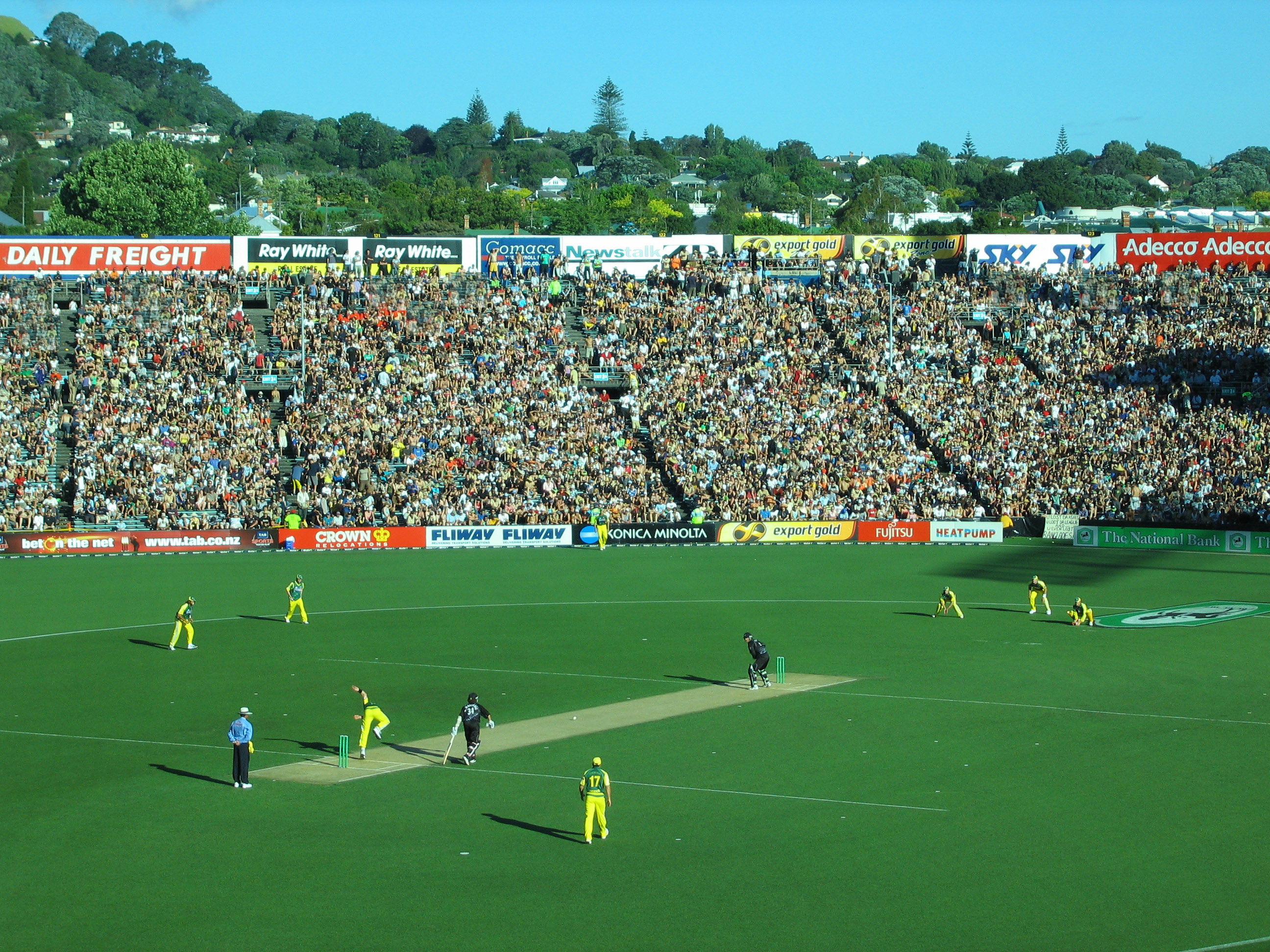
Chappell–Hadlee Series ODI cricket at Eden Park. New Zealand are at bat.

Cricket, rugby union, rugby league and netball are the prominent sporting rivalries between Australia and New Zealand. In addition, respective national teams have competed in other sports such as indoor bowls, basketball, association football, field hockey and touch football.

== Olympic Games ==
Australia attended its first Summer Olympic Games in 1896. New Zealand first attended in 1908, with the two countries competing together as Australasia. After World War I, the two nations split and since the 1920 Games have competed separately.

From 1952 both nations have sent teams to the Winter Olympic Games, except the non participation of New Zealand in 1956 and 1964.

Both nations have competed against each other and other Commonwealth nations at the British Empire Games and Commonwealth Games starting from 1930.

Australia has attended every Summer Paralympic Games since their inception in 1960; New Zealand first attended eight years later in 1968.

== Basketball ==
In 1938, the New Zealand Basketball Association sent the first New Zealand women's national basketball team to tour Australia. The men's teams have opposed each other in qualification for the 2002 FIBA World Championship and at the 2004 Athens Olympics. Australasia's National Basketball League has included the New Zealand Breakers as its sole non-Australian team since 2003. They are the two best-performing nations in FIBA Oceania. Teams from New Zealand's Women's Basketball Championship have no history of playing against those of Australia's Women's NBL.

== Cricket ==
The Australian cricket team first toured New Zealand in 1878 and recognised first class Test cricket between the respective national teams commenced in 1945–46. The underarm incident of 1981 stands as memorable for bringing Australian cricket into infamy and causing anger in New Zealand as well as being remarked upon by the respective heads of government. The two nations have exclusively and directly competed for the Trans-Tasman Trophy in test cricket since 1985–86 and for the Chappell–Hadlee Trophy in ODI cricket since 2006–07. They have competed at Twenty20 internationals and tournaments since their first such match occurring on 17 February 2005.The two teams were also the finalists at the 2015 Cricket World Cup.

== Mixed Martial Arts ==
The highest attended Ultimate Fighting Championship event in history took place in Melbourne when Australian Robert Whittaker attempted to defend his UFC middleweight championship against New Zealander Israel Adesanya in front of 57,127 people at Marvel Stadium. Adesanya would win the bout via a second-round knockout.

== Netball ==
Australia and New Zealand are the top two ranked teams in international netball. On 20 August 1938, at Royal Park, Melbourne, Australia defeated New Zealand 40–11. This was the first netball Test between Australia and New Zealand. It was also the world's first international netball match. Between 1963 and 2015, the two teams dominated the Netball World Cup and Commonwealth Games tournaments. Since 2010 the two teams have also competed for the Constellation Cup. Notable and memorable clashes have included the finals of the 1991, 1999 and 2011 World Netball Championships, the finals of the 2010 and the 2014 Commonwealth Games and the final match of the 2013 Constellation Cup.

== Rugby league ==
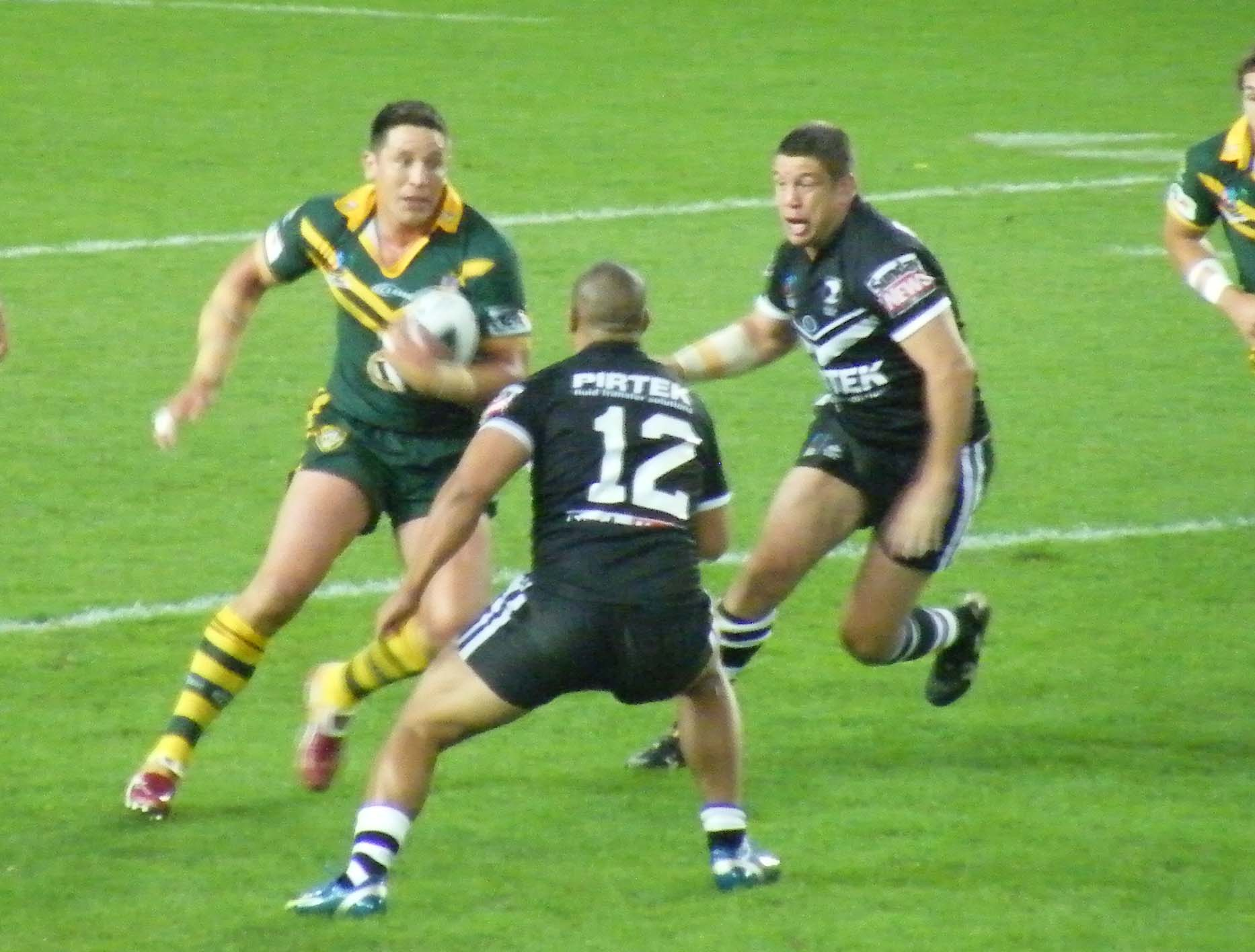
Kangaroo's Steve Price on the attack against the Kiwis at the Rugby League World Cup

The rivalry between the two national rugby league teams, the Kangaroos and the Kiwis, commenced with matches at the conclusion of the professional 1907 All Golds tour. A collaborative side, that toured Great Britain, was fielded in 1911–12, but with the exception of a 2007 team this has not been repeated. An ANZAC Test, for the Bill Kelly Memorial Trophy, was contested between the two countries from 1997 to 2017, and was held close to ANZAC Day. Additionally, the two countries competed in the Rugby League Tri-Nations and then, between 2009 and 2016, in the Rugby League Four Nations tournament. The teams have faced each other numerous times at the World Cup, however, unlike New Zealand Rugby League, the Australian Rugby League does not consider matches the World Cup as official Tests and therefore they have different totals in their head-to-head test records. Since 1995 a New Zealand professional team, the Warriors, have played in the Australia-centred National Rugby League.

The women's national teams, the Jillaroos and the Kiwi Ferns, played their first test match in 1995. Since 2000, they have faced each other several times at the Women's Rugby League World Cups and at the Rugby League Pacific Championships.

The wheelchair rugby league teams, the Wheelaroos and the Wheel Kiwis, played their first match in November 2024.

== Rugby union ==
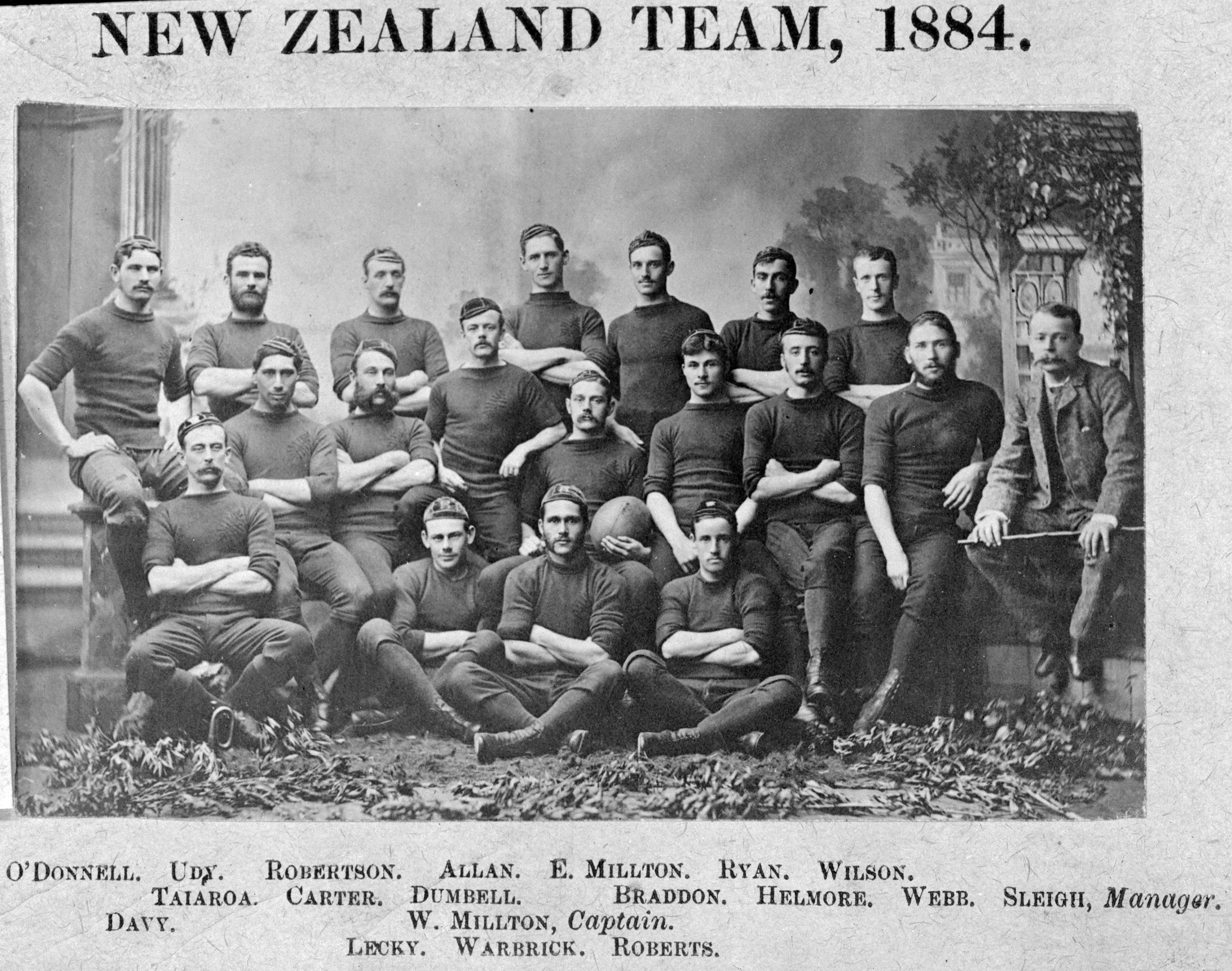
New Zealand rugby team in New South Wales, 1884

An early 1882 New South Wales Waratahs tour of New Zealand was followed by an 1884 New Zealand rugby union tour of New South Wales and then with the history of rugby union matches between Australia and New Zealand commencing in 1903. Since 1931 that rivalry has been pursued for the prize of possession of the Bledisloe Cup. Both nations together hosted the inaugural 1987 Rugby World Cup and have since furthered a spirited rivalry directly and indirectly competing against each other for the sport's Webb Ellis Cup world championship trophy on every subsequent occasion. The first women's international rugby test between the Wallaroos and Black Ferns occurred in 1994. From 1996 their men's national teams compete annually in The Rugby Championship, as do their elite provincial teams in Super Rugby.

== Soccer ==
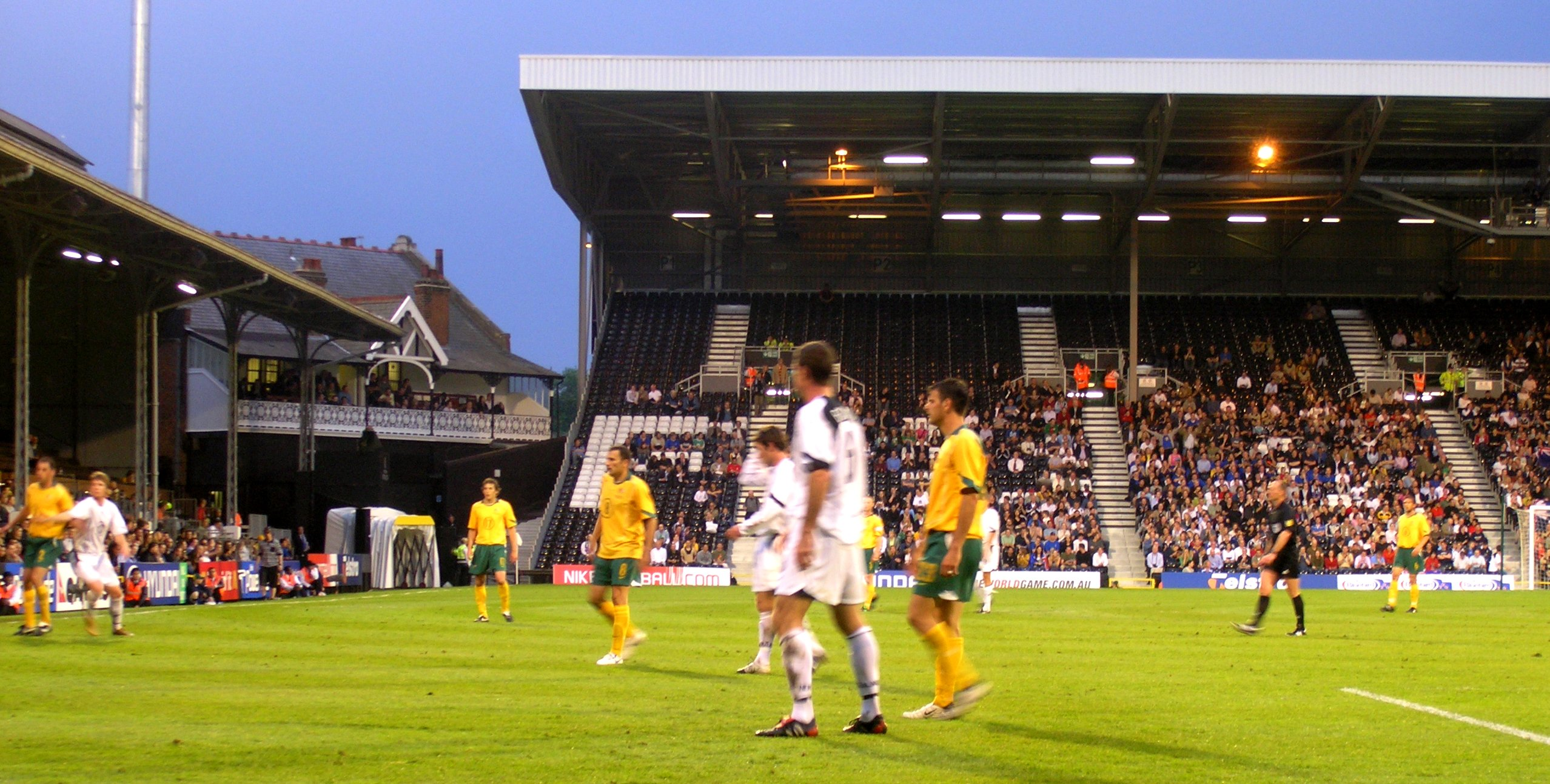
2005 Australia vs New Zealand soccer friendly. New Zealand in predominant white.

From 1966 to the end of 2005 the two countries competed in the Oceania Football Confederation and a New Zealand club side has played against Australian clubs in the professional soccer A-League since 2005–06. Their national youth teams competed in the OFC U-20 Championship between 1978 and 2001. A first match between the Matildas and Football Ferns female teams occurred in 1975. The women's teams competed for the Oceania Cup seven times between 1983 and 2003.

Between 1922 and 1954, and since 2023, the teams compete in the Soccer Ashes.

== Other sports ==
Australasian Championships in tennis commenced in 1905, later becoming the Australian Open. Between 1905 and 1915 the two nations combined their best players to compete in the Davis Cup, winning in all of 1907, 1908, 1909, 1911 and 1914.

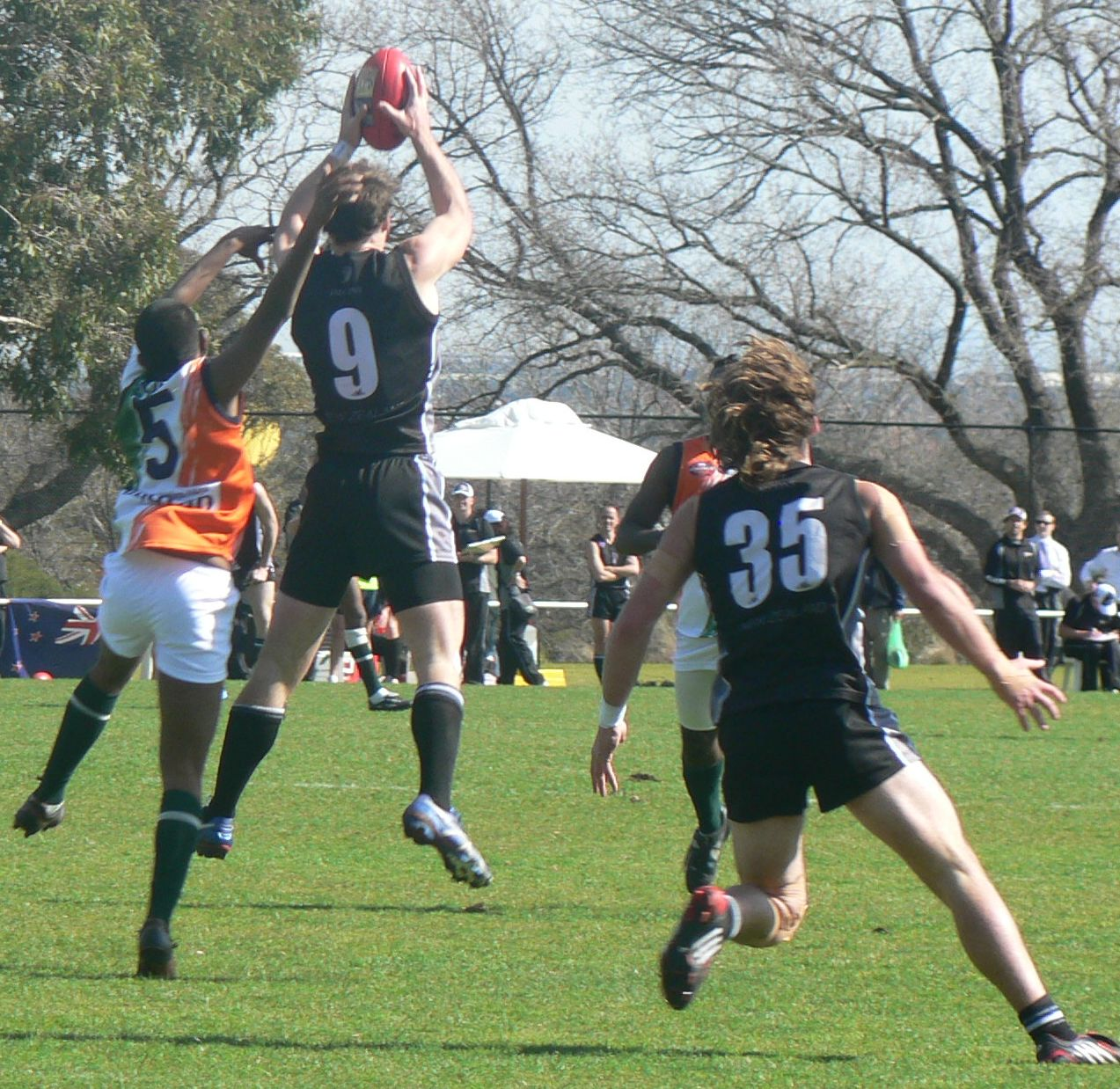
A player from the New Zealand national Australian rules football team taking a mark

The introduction of Australian rules football in New Zealand occurred around 1868 and maintained some cultural significance there until 1914 and then from the 1974 restarting of senior competition in three of its major cities. In 1890 an Australasian Football Council was formed including delegates from New Zealand and in 1908 New Zealand defeated both New South Wales and Queensland at the Jubilee Australasian Football Carnival. In 1961, the Melbourne Football Club toured New Zealand during its off season, becoming the first VFL/AFL club to do so. The New Zealand Falcons have represented their country in the sport since 1995 and the New Zealand AFL has existed since 1997. No international AFL exhibition matches have been played in New Zealand since 2001. AFL matches have been broadcast live into New Zealand since 2006 and there is regular coverage of AFL matches in The New Zealand Herald. Women's AFL in New Zealand found its first expression through a match convened by the Canterbury AFL in 2006.

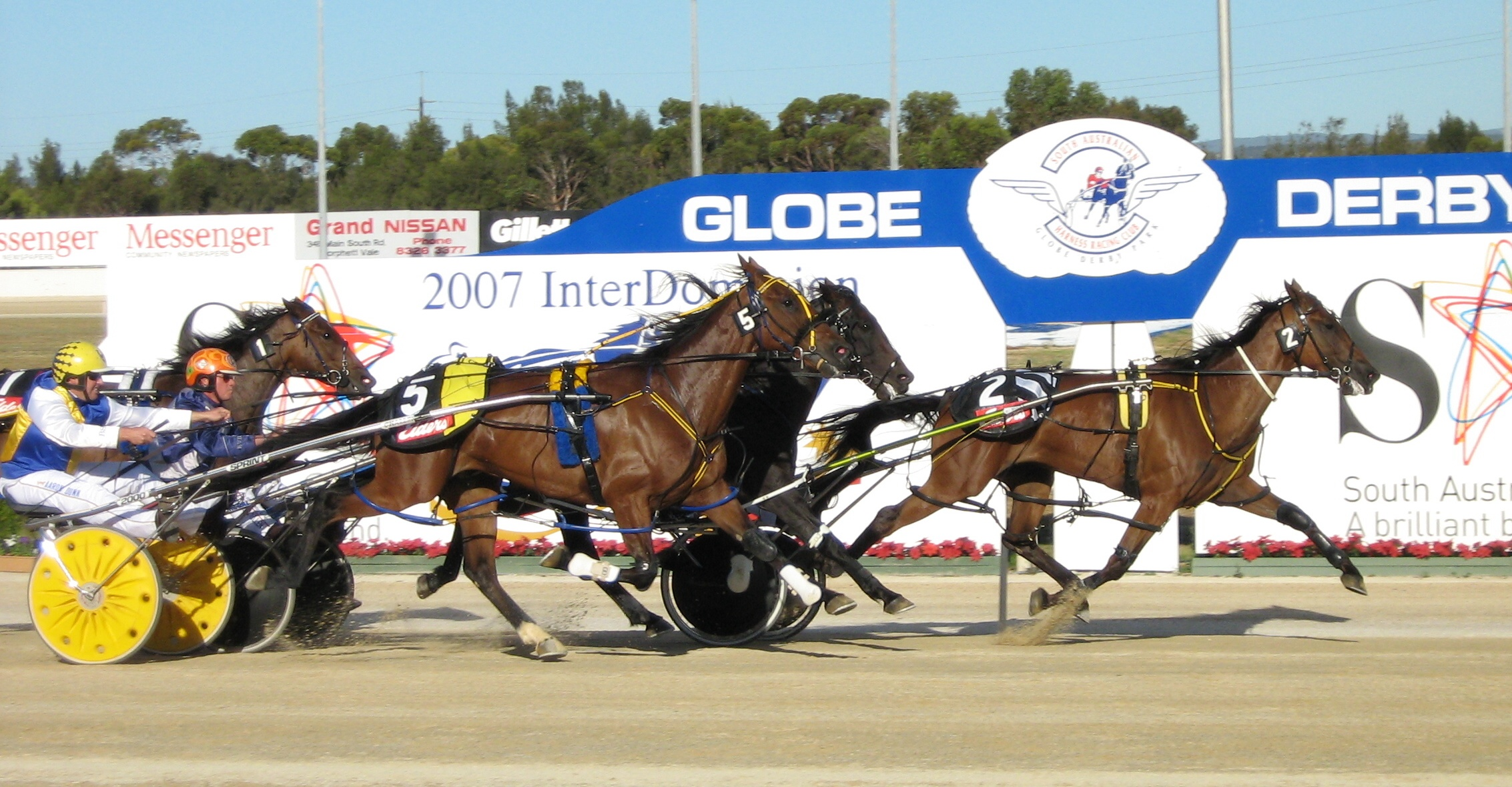
An Inter Dominion race in 2007

The Inter Dominion harness racing competition has been contested since 1936 at venues in both countries.

Track view during the 2006 V8 Supercars Round at Pukekohe

The Tasman Series of motor races across Australia and New Zealand was held from 1964 to 1975 and from 2001, the V8 Supercar Round at Pukekohe and subsequently the Hamilton 400 has been promoted as the New Zealand leg of the V8 Supercars category of touring car racing otherwise predominantly contested in Australia.

At ISF Women's World Championships from 1965 and in softball at the Summer Olympics – except the Championships of 1978, 1982, 1986 and 1990 – Australia can be seen to have consistently distinguished itself ahead of New Zealand. The Black Sox men's team won the inaugural Commonwealth Championships over Australia and other nations in 2006 and have otherwise outperformed Australia in world championships.

International indoor bowls competition began in 1975 when Australia and New Zealand first met for the Henselite Trophy. Trans-Tasman matches are held bi-annually with Australia being the current holder of the trophy as the test was a draw and Australia were the previous holders of the Trophy and therefore retained it.

The Black Sticks Men (New Zealand) defeated the Kookaburras (Australia) to win gold in field hockey at the 1976 Summer Olympics. Competition between the Black Sticks Women (New Zealand) and the Hockeyroos (Australia) female teams is recorded back to 1935. Both teams from both countries have contested the Oceania Cup biennially since 1999.

Respective touch football national teams of either and mixed gender, and across age categories, have sustained close competitive rivalry for championship honours through Touch Football World Cups contested since 1988.

As of 25 May 2009 and starting from 1987 the two nations had met 10 times at the sport of ice hockey.

Biennially since 1987 Australasian Masters Games have been contested in a range of sports by mature-aged athletes and teams of participants.

A PGA Tour of Australasia for men's golfers commenced under its current name in 1991.

The Australasian Pacers Grand Circuit for standardbred horses commenced in 1992 and the Australasian Breeders Crown futurity race series for 2 and 3-year-old horses bred in Australia and New Zealand is contested on a Sunday in late August each year at a venue in the Australian State of Victoria.

From 1997 both nations are known to have hosted the Oceania Badminton Championships. Overall in badminton at the Commonwealth Games it might be considered that Badminton Australia has marginally outperformed the Black Cocks.

They have had common membership of the International Korfball Federation since 1998 and they are recorded to have competed at the 2004 Asia-Oceania Korfball Championship.

Men's teams for both nations have contested the Oceania Handball Nations Cup from 2004 with both nations being members of the Oceania Handball Federation.

== See also ==
- List of Australia-New Zealand and Australasia topics
