= Australian and New Zealand Cultural Arts =

Australian and New Zealand Cultural Arts Limited (ANZCA) is a privately funded not-for-profit institution that assesses music in Australia, New Zealand, Malaysia, Singapore, Indonesia and Thailand. The organisation was developed to be an alternative to the AMEB, allowing contemporary as well as the traditional classical syllabus. They focus on both Practical and Theoretical components.

== History ==
In 1982 Nancye Woodford and her Sister June McLean saw the need for a music examination Board that promoted Modern style music along with traditional classical music. Originally ANZCA was known as the Society of Australasian Arts (SAA) before being formally changed to Australian and New Zealand Cultural Arts (ANZCA)

As news of the fledging society (SAA) spread, interest in the new examinations grew and Teachers signed on in significant numbers. Music examiners were appointed and the administrative framework established soon SAA's operations were formalised across Australia and New Zealand. Initially, all matters relating to the conduct of the examination programme were managed from Ivor Morgan's home. Ivor had been appointed Secretary of the Board. Later the administrative hub moved to a purpose-built office space in June McLean's home, and then (with the increase of Office Staff and equipment to a stand-alone building in Albion Crescent, Greensborough. Later the Office moved to a purpose-built building in the Business area of Greensborough and finally to its current address in the Business Hub in Rocks Road Nunawading Victoria.

ANZCA commenced examinations in 1983 and was given accreditation as a non-profit organization. The examinations, for a wide variety of instruments, were quickly accepted by teachers and students throughout Australia and New Zealand. In 2006 examinations commenced in S.E.Asia. ANZCA now conducts examinations in seven countries and is still expanding.

Founders:

Nancye Woodford

June McLean

Founding Directors:

Nancye Woodford

June McLean

Yvonne Lawn

Bill Lock

Ivor Morgan

== Instruments ==
ANZCA offers exams in the following instruments:

- Classical and Modern Accordion
- Modern Bass
- Mixed Clarinet
- Classical, Modern and Jazz Cornet/Trumpet
- Classical Double bass
- Modern Drumkit
- Classical and Modern Flute
- Classical and Modern Guitar
- Modern Keyboard
- Church and Modern Organ
- Classical, Modern and 'All Occasions' Piano
- Mixed Recorder
- Mixed Saxophone
- Classical and Modern Singing
- Modern Trombone
- Classical Viola
- Classical Violin
- Classical Cello

Note: Instruments listed as Mixed have a single syllabus that has both Modern and Classical components.
