= Australasian Plant Pathology =

Peer-reviewed journal

- Discipline: Plant pathology
- Language: English
- Edited by: Philip O'Brien

Publication details
- Former name(s): APPS Newsletter, A.P.P. Australasian Plant Pathology
- History: 1972–present
- Publisher: Springer Science+Business Media
- Frequency: Bimonthly
- Impact factor: 1.599 (2020)

Standard abbreviations
- ISO 4: Australas. Plant Pathol.

Indexing
- CODEN: AAPPDN
- ISSN: 0815-3191 (print); 1448-6032 (web)
- OCLC no.: 06072212

Links
- Journal homepage

Australasian Plant Pathology is a peer-reviewed international journal that publishes original research and critical reviews on phytopathology in the Australasian region. It is published by Springer Science+Business Media in cooperation with the Australasian Plant Pathology Society.

The journal began in 1972 as the APPS Newsletter. In 1978 it was renamed A.P.P. Australasian Plant Pathology, and in 1984 it adopted its current name. As of early 2025 there have been 54 volumes, at six issues per year. According to the Journal Citation Reports, the journal has a 2020 impact factor of 1.599.
