= Australasian Society for Computers in Learning in Tertiary Education =

The Australasian Society for Computers in Learning in Tertiary Education, also known as ASCILITE is an incorporated not-for-profit professional association for those engaged in the educational use of technologies in tertiary education. The association, which was incorporated in the state of South Australia in 1987 is governed by the ASCILITE constitution and by-laws in accordance with the Associations Incorporations Act 1985.

ASCILITE is a professionally connected community of over 500 professionals and academics working in fields associated with enhancing learning and teaching through the pedagogical use of technologies. It seeks to shape the future of tertiary education, particularly through enabling and sharing high quality research, innovation and evidence-based technology-enhanced practices in tertiary education.

ASCILITE's membership includes practitioners, researchers and teacher educators, learning designers, web and media developers, Learning & Teaching Directors and senior managers responsible for institutional strategies and budgets that encompass the pedagogical use of technologies. In addition to individual membership, the association offers an institutional membership scheme to tertiary institutions.

The association is widely recognized in the Tertiary Sector and it is included in the Higher Education Research and Development Society of Australasia's professional association listings.

The association is governed by an Executive that consists of a President, Vice-President and Treasurer and 8 non-office bearer committee members elected by the membership in alternate years of 3 and then 4 members. The Executive is supported by a Secretariat.

ASCILITE also publishes the Australasian Journal of Educational Technology (AJET) which is a refereed journal publishing research and review articles on educational technologies and the application and integration of those technologies in tertiary education.

ASCILITE holds an annual conference in early December of each year. The conferences are hosted by different host institutions (universities) each year.

== History ==
The beginnings of ASCILITE can be traced to 1983 when the University of Queensland hosted a conference on Computers in Learning in Tertiary Education (CALITE, 1983) that attracted approximately 200 delegates. By 1985 interest had grown and at CALITE (1985) John Bowden led the foundation of the Australian Society for Computers in Learning in Tertiary Education (ASCILITE). Since then ASCILITE has hosted annual conferences each December, apart from a collaborative venture with the World Conference on Computers in Education in 1990 when it was host to a special Computer Based Training session and a second collaboration with the TAFE and Schools sectors at the 1994 APITITE (Asia Pacific Information Technology in Training and Education) conference.

During the late 1990s the Society's focus was broadening beyond Australia and in 1997 the Society's name was changed from ‘Australian’ to ‘Australasian’ to reflect the growing regional role that the Society was playing in the area of technology enhanced learning. The hosting of the 2002 conference in Auckland, New Zealand marked the twentieth conference and also the first time that ASCILITE was hosted outside Australia. In 2024 ASCILITE hosted its biggest conference ever in Melbourne, Australia, with over 500 participants.
