= 1918 in New Zealand =

- Decades: 1890s; 1900s; 1910s; 1920s; 1930s
- See also: History of New Zealand; List of years in New Zealand; Timeline of New Zealand history

The following lists events that happened during 1918 in New Zealand.

The jubilation over the end of World War I was overshadowed by the Spanish flu pandemic reaching New Zealand. In four months, it is estimated that over 8600 New Zealanders died of the disease and between one third and one half of the population were infected. The death rate for Māori was estimated at 42 per thousand (approx 2,160 deaths) compared to 5.6 per 1000 (6,400 deaths) for European New Zealanders.

== Incumbents ==
=== Regal and viceregal ===
- Head of State – George V
- Governor-General – Arthur Foljambe, 2nd Earl of Liverpool
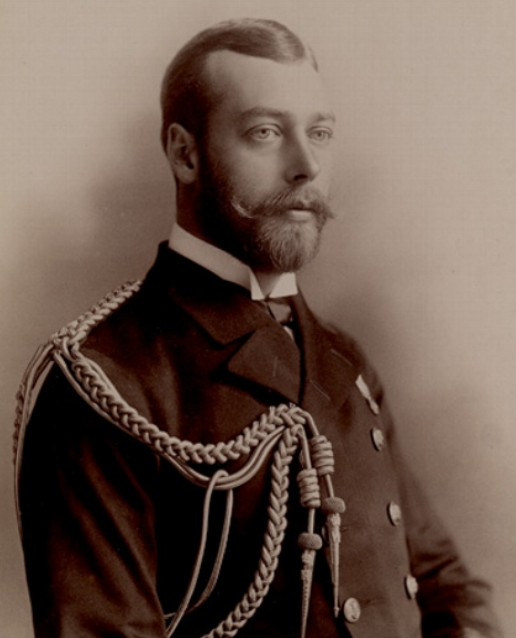
George V

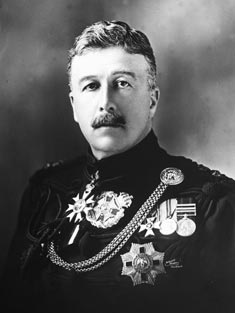
Lord Liverpool

=== Government ===
The 19th New Zealand Parliament continues for a fourth year as a grand coalition led by the Reform Party.

- Speaker of the House – Frederic Lang (Reform Party)
- Prime Minister – William Massey (Reform Party)
- Minister of Finance – Joseph Ward (Liberal Party)
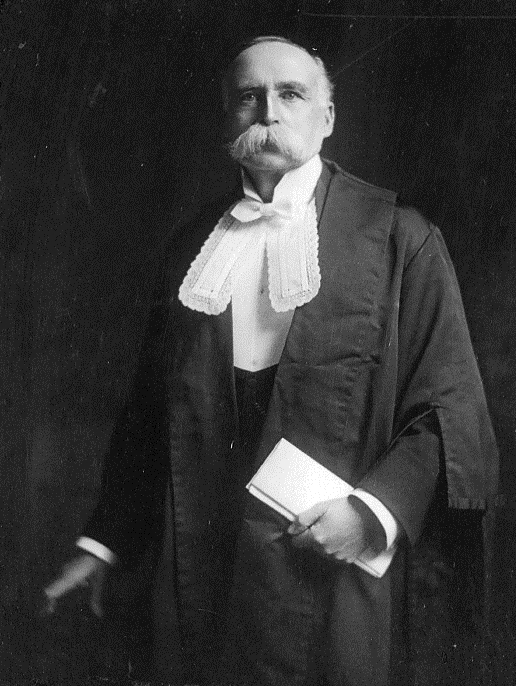
Frederic Lang

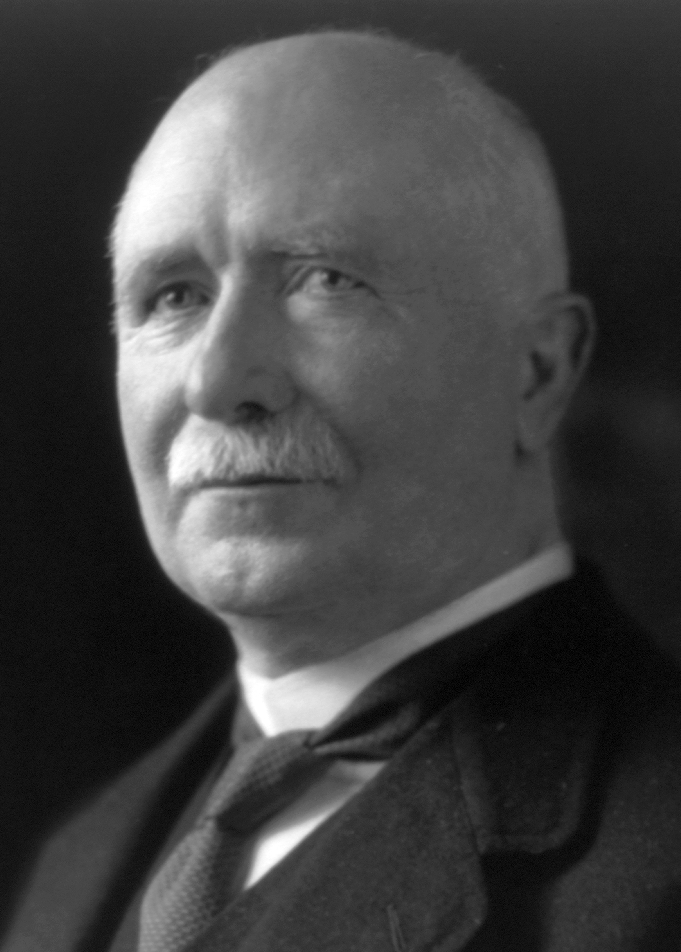
William Massey

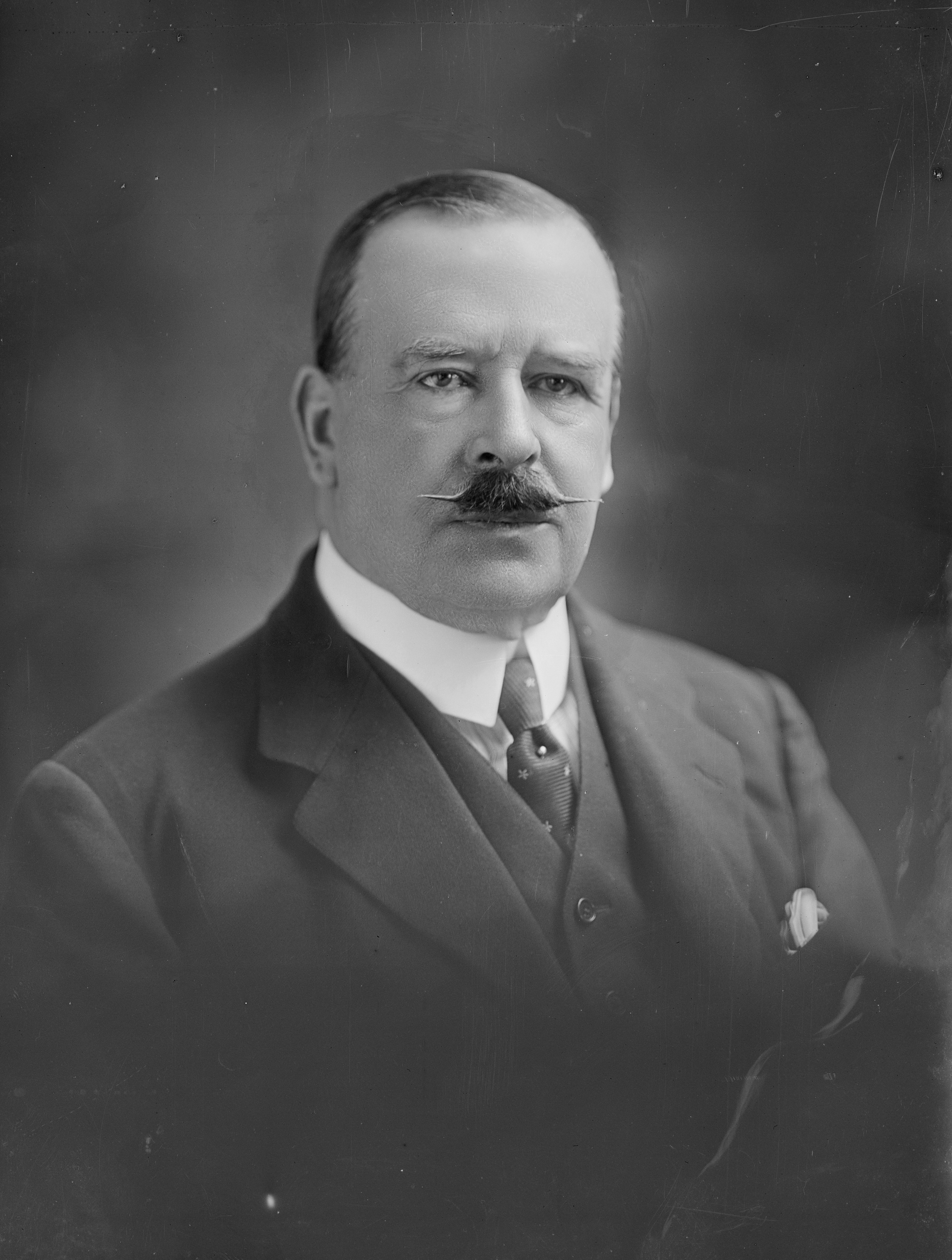
Joseph Ward

=== Parliamentary opposition ===
- Leader of the Opposition – Joseph Ward (Liberal Party). Ward retains the title even though he is part of the coalition government.
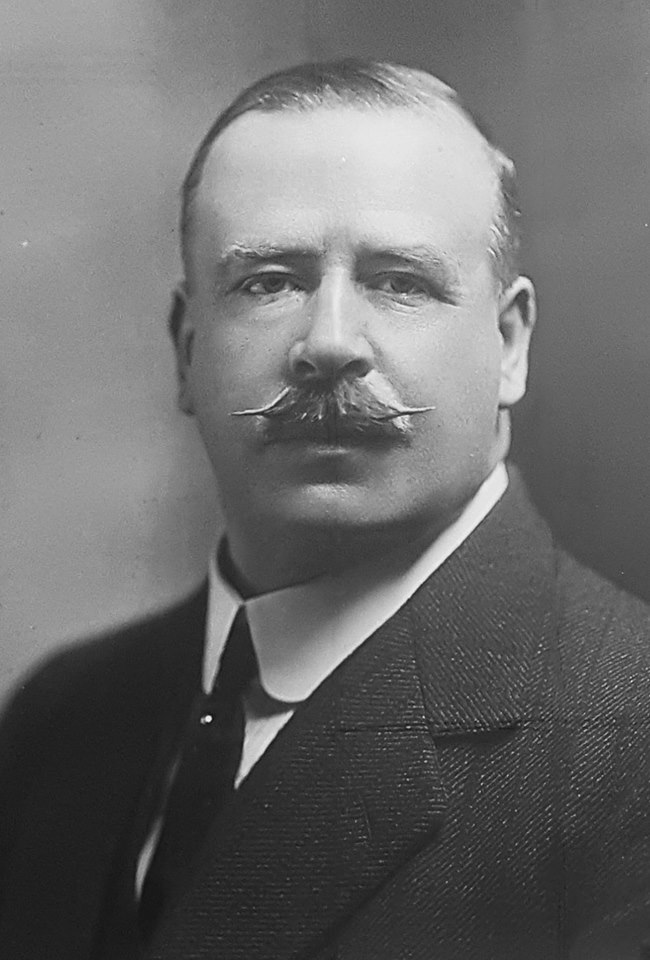
Joseph Ward

=== Judiciary ===
- Chief Justice – Sir Robert Stout
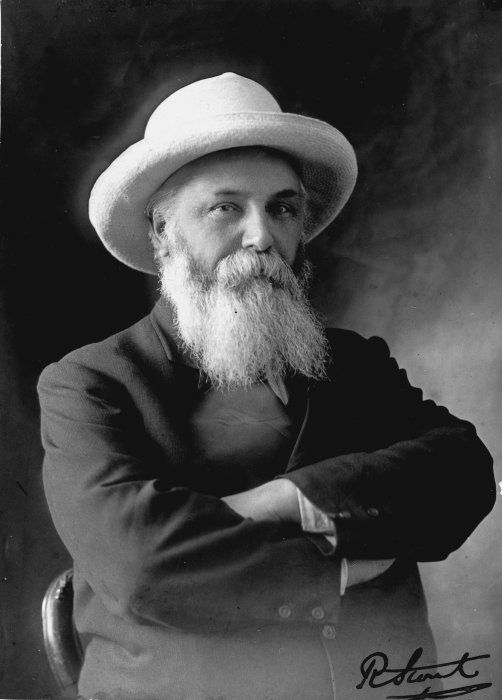
Robert Stout

=== Main centre leaders ===
- Mayor of Auckland – James Gunson
- Mayor of Wellington – John Luke
- Mayor of Christchurch – Henry Holland
- Mayor of Dunedin – James Clark
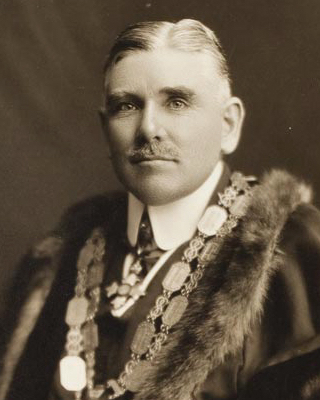
James Gunson

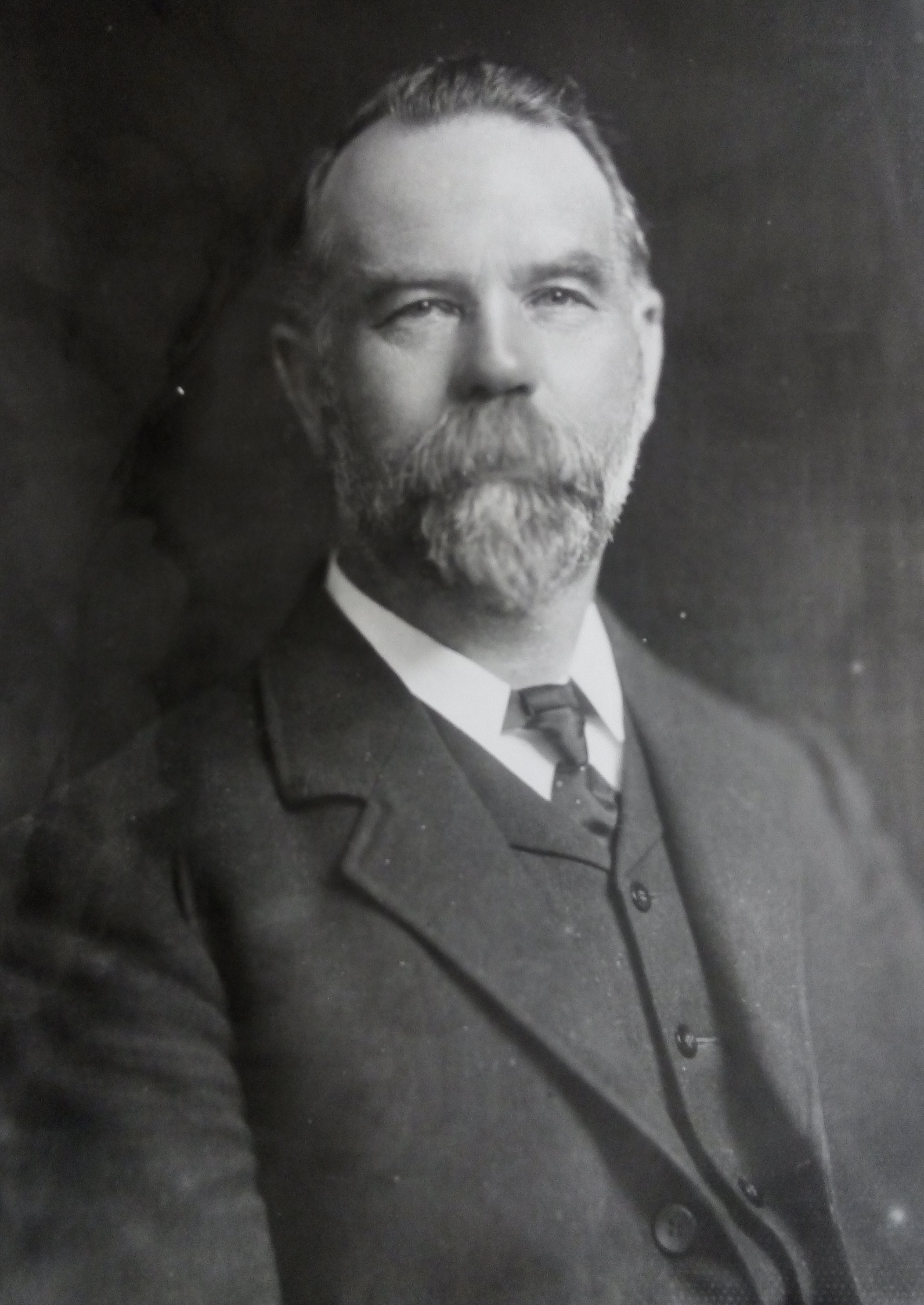
John Luke

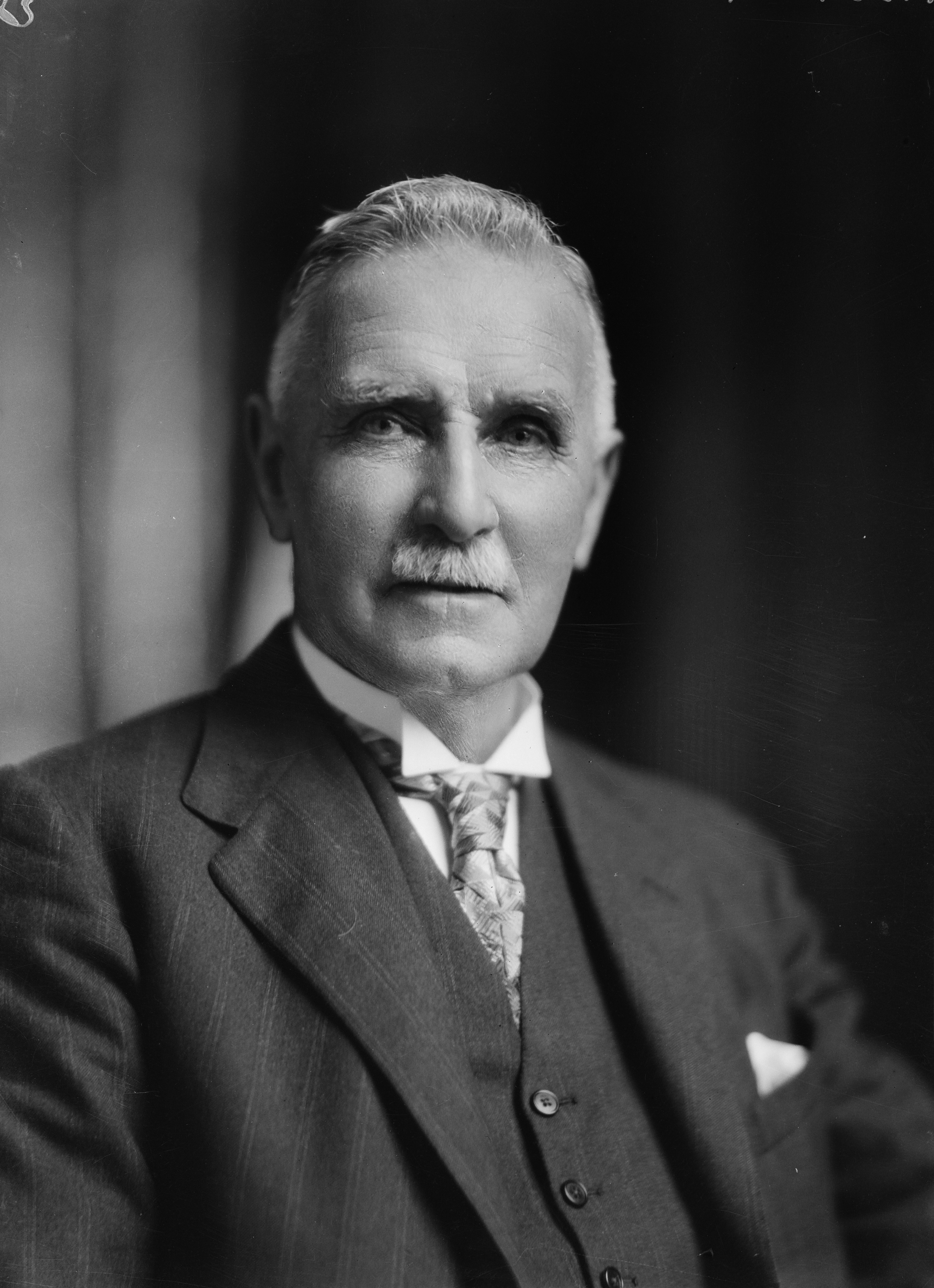
Henry Holland

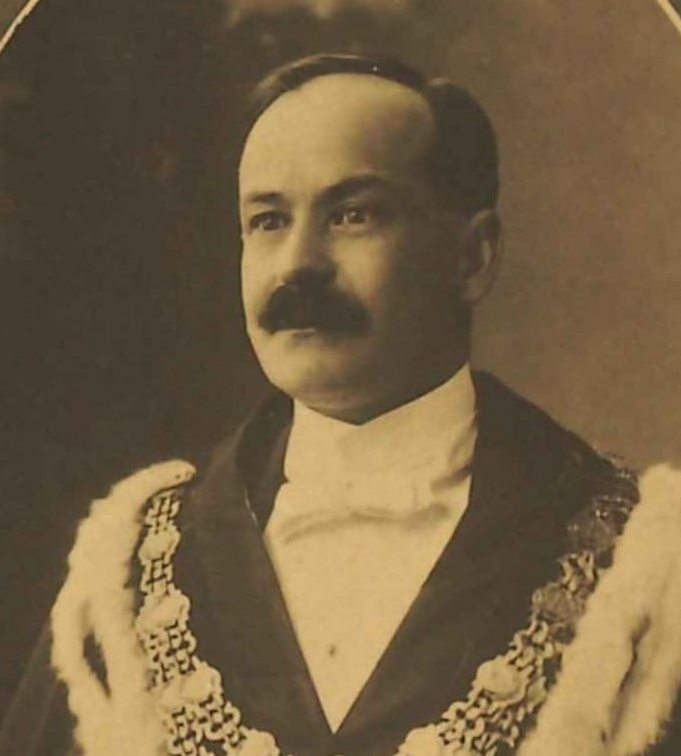
James Clark

== Events ==
- 19–20 March: Raetihi forest fire kills 3 and destroys over 150 homes.
- Early October: The first cases of Spanish flu are recorded in Auckland.
- 12 October: Troop ship RMS Niagara returns, carrying a number of people ill with influenza. It is not quarantined. William Massey and Joseph Ward are aboard. Although later cited as the cause of the Spanish flu epidemic, 6 persons had already died in the 3 days preceding its arrival.
- 18 November: Influenza is "hastily" gazetted as a notifiable disease.
- December: The flu epidemic eases. Over 8600 have died including at least 1260 Māori.
- 2 December: Aviation Act 1918, to control aviation in New Zealand, is passed by Parliament.

=== Undated ===
- Parliament moves into Parliament House although it is not yet completed.

== Arts and literature ==
See 1918 in art, 1918 in literature, Category:1918 books

=== Music ===
See: 1918 in music

=== Film ===
See: 1918 in film, List of New Zealand feature films, Cinema of New Zealand, Category:1918 films

== Sport ==
=== Golf ===
- The New Zealand Open championship was not held due to the war.

=== Horse racing ===
==== Harness racing ====
- New Zealand Trotting Cup – Author Dillon
- Auckland Trotting Cup – Harold Junior

==== Thoroughbred racing ====
- New Zealand Cup – Sasanof
- Auckland Cup – Mascot
- Wellington Cup – Nobleman
- New Zealand Derby – Gloaming

=== Lawn bowls ===
The national outdoor lawn bowls championships are held in Dunedin.

- Men's singles champion – W. Foster (Caledonian Bowling Club)
- Men's pair champions – W.M. Hogg, E. Harraway (skip) (Dunedin Bowling Club)
- Men's fours champions – W. Robson, J. Spinks, E. Falconer, C.R. Smith (skip) (Otago Bowling Club)

=== Rugby union ===
- The Ranfurly Shield (held by Wellington) is not contested as interprovincial matches are cancelled due to the war.

=== Soccer ===
Provincial league champions:

- Auckland: North Shore
- Canterbury: Excelsior
- Hawke's Bay: Waipukurau
- Otago: Southern Dunedin
- Southland: No competition
- Wanganui: No competition
- Wellington: Porirua

== Births ==
=== January–March ===
- 4 January – Anne Elder, ballet dancer, poet (d. 1976)
- 5 January
  - Roy Cowan, potter, illustrator, printmaker (d. 2006)
  - Margaret Marks, cricketer (d. 2016)
  - Joyce Sullivan, netball player (d. 2002)
- 7 January – Colin Snedden, cricket player and commentator (d. 2011)
- 11 January – John Mackey, Roman Catholic bishop (d. 2014)
- 15 January – Arthur Kinsella, politician (d. 2004)
- 19 January – Mihi Edwards, writer, social worker, teacher (d. 2008)
- 28 January – Trevor Skeet, lawyer, politician (d. 2004)
- 5 February – Joe Ongley, cricket player and administrator, lawyer, jurist (d. 2004)
- 24 February − Daniel Watkins, agrochemical distributor and manufacturer (d. 1982)
- 26 February – Lloyd Geering, theologian (d. 2026)
- 27 February – Brian Carbury, World War II fighter pilot (b. 1961)
- 14 March – Ivan Lichter, thoracic surgeon, palliative care pioneer (d. 2009)
- 17 March – Patrick Eisdell Moore, otolaryngologist (d. 2015)
- 21 March – Lloyd White, diplomat (d. 1981)
- 25 March – Nazmi Mehmeti, Muslim community leader (d. 1995)
- 30 March – Elva Bett, artist, art historian, art gallery director (d. 2016)

=== April–June ===
- 6 April – Jimmy Kemp, cricketer (d. 1994)
- 7 April – Moana-Nui-a-Kiwa Ngarimu, soldier, Victoria Cross recipient (d. 1943)
- 16 April – Roger Mirams, film producer and director (d. 2004)
- 17 April – Dorothea Horsman, women's rights advocate (d. 1994)
- 18 April – Patrick O'Dea, public servant (d. 2010)
- 27 April – Douglas Dumbleton, cricket player and umpire (d. 2005)
- 11 May – John O'Sullivan, cricketer (d. 1991)
- 18 May – Walter Metcalf, physical chemist (d. 2008)
- 19 May – Nevile Lodge, cartoonist (d. 1989)
- 26 May – Freda Bream, author (d. 1996)
- 8 June – George Edward Hughes, philosopher and logician (d. 1994)
- 22 June – Mana Strickland, Cook Islands educator and politician (d. 1996)
- 27 June – Edgar Kain, World War II fighter pilot (d. 1940)

=== July–September ===
- 1 July – Clive Boyce, local-body politician
- 31 July – Frank Renouf, businessman, philanthropist (d. 1998)
- 8 August – Logan Sloane, politician (d. 1980)
- 9 August – Frank Rennie, soldier (d. 1992)
- 12 August – Sid Hurst, farmer (d. 2016)
- 30 August – Laurie Francis, diplomat and lawyer (d. 1993)
- 11 September – Desmond Scott, World War II fighter pilot (d. 1997)
- 15 September – Phil Lamason, World War II bomber pilot and prisoner-of-war leader (d. 2012)
- 21 September – Avis Higgs, textile designer, painter (d. 2016)
- 23 September – Douglas Bagnall, air force officer (d. 2000)

=== October–December ===
- 1 October – Gloria Rawlinson, writer and editor (d. 1995)
- 4 October – Gordon Burgess, cricket player and administrator (d. 2000)
- 8 October – Olga Jekyll, fencer (d. 2014)
- 22 October – Marcel Stanley, philatelist (d. 1990)
- 24 October – Frank O'Flynn, lawyer, politician (d. 2003)
- 2 November – Robbie Robson, lawn bowls player (d. 1996)
- 4 November – Sidney Koreneff, World War II French resistance worker, newspaper managing director, Anglican priest (d. 1997)
- 12 November – Denis Miller, World War II bomber pilot, airline pilot (d. 2009)
- 15 November – Neil Williams, water polo player (d. 1998)
- 16 November – Frank Newhook, plant pathologist (d. 1999)
- 23 November – Gordon Bisson, jurist (d. 2010)
- 29 November – Mick Holland, speedway rider, stock car racing pioneer (d. 2005)
- 9 December – Harold Cassie, cricket umpire (d. 1978)
- 12 December – Neville Thornton, rugby union player, school principal (d. 1998)

=== Exact date unknown ===
- The Hawk, Thoroughbred racehorse
- Night Raid, Thoroughbred racehorse

== Deaths ==
=== January–March ===
- 8 January – Taare Parata, politician (born 1865)
- 2 February – Arthur Hume, public servant (born c.1838)
- 3 February – Ernest Hoben, rugby union administrator (born 1864)
- 6 February – Sir Henry Miller, politician (born 1830)
- 17 February – Harry Bedford, politician, university lecturer (born 1877)
- 18 February – William Morgan, politician (born 1851)
- 20 February – Gerhard Mueller, surveyor, engineer, land commissioner (born 1835)
- 24 February
  - Luke Adams, potter (born 1838)
  - Victor Spencer, soldier (born 1896)
- 12 March – Andrew Maginnity, politician (born 1849)
- 29 March – Harry Fulton, army officer (born 1869)

=== April–June ===
- 9 April – Hubert Turtill, rugby union and rugby league player (born 1880)
- 30 April – Eric Harper, rugby union player, athlete (born 1877)
- 9 May – Richard Hutton Davies, soldier (born 1861)
- 11 May – Felix Hunger, farmer, coloniser (born c.1837)
- 3 June – Jane McBride, hotel proprietor (born c. 1844)
- 4 June – Hāmiora Mangakāhia, Ngāti Whanaunga leader, politician (born 1838)
- 9 June – Charles Fell, barrister, artist, politician, mayor of Nelson (1882–87) (born 1844)
- 11 June – Charles Gray, politician, mayor of Christchurch (1891–92) (born 1853)
- 13 June – Charles Johnston, politician, mayor of Wellington (1890) (born 1845)
- 28 June – Alexander Turnbull, bibliophile (born 1868)

=== July–September ===
- 10 July – Charles Rawlins, politician (born 1846)
- 14 July – Samuel Farr, architect (born 1827)
- 22 July – Thomas Tanner, politician (born 1830)
- 23 July
  - William Barnes, blacksmith, labour reformer (born c.1827)
  - Albert Rowland, race walker (born 1885)
- 25 July – Richard Travis, soldier, Victoria Cross recipient (born 1884)
- 30 July – Alexander Hatrick, merchant, shipowner, tourist entrepreneur, politician, mayor of Wanganui (1897–1904) (born 1857)
- 31 July – Henry Suter, zoologist (born 1841)
- 20 August
  - William Campbell, Presbyterian minister (born 1840)
  - Richard Meredith, politician (born 1843)
- 24 August – Samuel Forsyth, soldier, Victoria Cross recipient (born 1891)
- 25 August – Jack Arnst, racing cyclist (born 1883)
- 4 September – Robert Fletcher, politician (born 1863)
- 6 September – Elizabeth Yates, first female mayor in the British Empire (born c.1845)
- 8 September – Tony Foster, school principal and inspector, university lecturer (born 1853)
- 11 September – Ernie Dodd, rugby union player (born 1880)
- 13 September – Henry Okey, politician (born 1857)
- 14 September – Charles Macintosh, rugby union player, politician, mayor of Timaru (1901–02) (born 1869)
- 22 September – Joseph Joel Hammond, aviator (born 1886)
- 29 September
  - George McMurtry, chemical engineer, mining manager, orchardist (born 1867)
  - Lawrence Weathers, soldier, Victoria Cross recipient (born 1890)

=== October–December ===
- 23 October – Henry James Nicholas, soldier, Victoria Cross recipient (born 1891)
- 29 October – Charles Adams, surveyor, astronomer, public servant (born 1840)
- 1 November – Albert Gourlay, Australian rules footballer (born 1881)
- 5 November – Jimmy Ridland, rugby union player (born 1882)
- 6 November – George Stephenson, auctioneer, rugby player, impresario (born 1874)
- 11 November – Andrew Rutherford, politician (born 1842)
- 13 November – Alfred Hindmarsh, politician (born 1860)
- 15 November – Iraia Te Whaiti, farmer, Ngāti Kahungunu leader and historian (born c.1861)
- 16 November – Ned Sale, cricketer (born 1883)
- 17 November – Helen Smith, clothing manufacturer and retailer (born 1873)
- 18 November – David Buick, politician (born 1848)
- 21 November – William Gibbes, cricketer (born 1880)
- 23 November – Michael Verdon, Roman Catholic bishop (born 1838)
- 28 November – Margaret Cruickshank, doctor (born 1873)
- 29 November – Heremia Te Wake, Te Rarawa leader, catechist (born c.1830s)
- 8 December – Margaret Burn, school teacher and principal (born 1825)
- 10 December – Francis Petre, architect (born 1847)
- 12 December – Louis Steele, artist and engraver (born 1842)
- 18 December – Jim Gilmour, rugby league player (born 1881)

== See also ==
- History of New Zealand
- List of years in New Zealand
- Military history of New Zealand
- Timeline of New Zealand history
- Timeline of New Zealand's links with Antarctica
- Timeline of the New Zealand environment
