= 1997 in New Zealand =

- Decades: 1970s; 1980s; 1990s; 2000s; 2010s
- See also: History of New Zealand; List of years in New Zealand; Timeline of New Zealand history

The following lists events that happened during 1997 in New Zealand.

== Population ==
- Estimated population as of 31 December: 3,802,700.
- Increase since 31 December 1996: 40,400 (1.07%).
- Males per 100 Females: 97.1.

== Incumbents ==
=== Regal and viceregal ===
- Head of State – Elizabeth II
- Governor-General – The Rt Hon. Sir Michael Hardie Boys GNZM, GCMG, QSO

=== Government ===
The 45th New Zealand Parliament continued. Government was The National Party, led by Jim Bolger, in coalition with New Zealand First, led by Winston Peters.

- Speaker of the House – Doug Kidd
- Prime Minister – Jim Bolger then Jenny Shipley
- Deputy Prime Minister – Winston Peters
- Minister of Finance – Bill Birch
- Minister of Foreign Affairs – Don McKinnon
- Chief Justice — Sir Thomas Eichelbaum

=== Parliamentary leaders ===
- Labour – (37 seats) Helen Clark (Leader of the Opposition)
- Alliance – (13 seats) Jim Anderton
- ACT New Zealand – (8 seats) Richard Prebble
- United New Zealand- (1 seat) Peter Dunne

=== Main centre leaders ===
- Mayor of Auckland – Les Mills
- Mayor of Hamilton – Margaret Evans
- Mayor of Wellington – Mark Blumsky
- Mayor of Christchurch – Vicki Buck
- Mayor of Dunedin – Sukhi Turner

== Events ==
- 8 February: Stephen Anderson, 24, shoots 11 people, killing 6 of them (including his wife and parents) at Raurimu.
- 16 July: List MP Alamein Kopu resigns from the Alliance Party but remains a member of parliament. This causes controversy because Kopu has signed contracts with the party that she would resign from Parliament should she leave the party.
- 10 September: Parliament's privileges committee finds that Alamein Kopu is entitled to remain an independent MP.
- Argentina reopens its embassy in Wellington (closed since 1982).

== Arts and literature ==
- Paddy Richardson wins the Robert Burns Fellowship.
- Montana New Zealand Book Awards:
  - Book of the Year/Cultural Heritage: Jessie Munro, The Story of Suzanne Aubert
  - First Book Awards
    - Fiction: Dominic Sheehan, Finding Home
    - Poetry: Diane Brown, Before the Divorce We Go To Disneyland
    - Non-Fiction: Jessie Munro, The Story of Suzanne Aubert

See 1997 in art, 1997 in literature, Category:1997 books

=== Music ===
==== New Zealand Music Awards ====
Winners are shown first with nominees underneath.

- Album of the Year: Strawpeople – Vicarious
  - Emma Paki – Oxygen of Love
  - Garageland – Last Exit to Garageland
  - OMC
  - The Mutton Birds – Envy of Angels
- Single of the Year: DLT Featuring Che Fu – Chains
  - Bic Runga – Bursting Through
  - Garageland
  - Strawpeople – Taller Than God
  - The Mutton Birds
- Best Male Vocalist: Che Fu – Chains
  - Jeremy Eade (Garageland)
  - Jon Toogood (Shihad)
- Best Female Vocalist: Bic Runga
  - Emma Paki
  - Fiona McDonald (Strawpeople)
- Best Group: Garageland
  - Shihad
  - The Mutton Birds
- Most Promising Male Vocalist: Daniel Haimona (Dam Native)
  - Andrew Tilby (Breathe)
  - Ed Cake (Bressa Creeting Cake)
- Most Promising Female Vocalist: Lole Usoalii
  - Andrea Cook
  - Maryanne Antonuvich (D Faction)
- Most Promising Group: Dam Native
  - Bike
  - Bressa Creeting Cake
  - Cinematic
- International Achievement: OMC
  - Crowded House
  - Jane Campion
  - Peter Jackson
- Best Video: Sigi Spath & Joe Lonie – if I Had My Way (Supergroove)
  - Kevin Sprig – La La Land (Shihad)
  - Jonathan King – Behold My Kool Style (Damn Native)
- Best Producer: Malcolm Welsford / Karl Steven – Backspacer (Supergroove)
  - Alan Jansson – How Bizarre
  - Eddie Raynor – ENZSO
- Best Engineer: Rick Huntington / Alan Jansson – How Bizarre (OMC)
  - Chris Van Der Geer (Strawpeople)
  - Malcolm Welsford – Backspacer (Supergroove)
- Best Jazz Album: Bluetrain – No Free Lunch
  - Jazz in the Present Tense – Jazz in the Present Tense
  - Nairobi Trio – Shelf Life
- Best Classical Album: the Nzso, Janos Furst, Michael Houston – Live : Tower Beethoven Festival
  - New Zealand String Quartet – Bartok String Quartet 1–5
  - Alexander Ivashin & Tama Vesmas – Sergie Prokofiev
- Best Country Album: Coalrangers – Coast to Coast
  - Dennis Marsh – Out of Nashville
  - Bartlett, Dugan, Vaughan – Together Again
- Best Folk Album: Wild Geese – Betwixt Time and Place
  - Michael Scorey – Angel Station
  - Bob Bickerton – Music in the Glen
- Best Gospel Album: Max Jacobson – Found
  - The Lands – Arbor Day
  - Evan Silva – Aint No Two Ways About It
- Best Mana Maori Album: Emma Paki – Oxygen of Love
  - DLT – The True School
  - Dam Native – Behold My Kool Style
- Best Mana Reo Album: St Josephs Maori Girls College – a Gift of Song
  - Te Kura Tuatahi Me Te Ropu Kapahaka O Ranana – Te Wainui A Rua
  - Turakina Maori Girls College – Mana Wahine
- Best Childrens Album: Universal Childrens Audio – Waiata Karahere
  - Helen Willberg – Ranona Moemoea
  - Love To Sing Choir – Love My First Songbook
- Best Polynesian Album: Annie Crummer – Seventh Wave
  - Felise Mikaele -Se Taitau
  - The Five Stars – Samoa Ea
- Best Songwriter: Dl Thompson, C Ness, A McNaughton, K Rangihuna – Chains (DLT Feat Che Fu)
  - Paul Casserley, Fiona McDonald, Greg Johnson – Boxers (Strawpeople)
  - Bic Runga – Bursting Through
- Best Cover: Wayne Conway – ENZSO (ENZSO)
  - Jeremy Takacs, Karl & Jon – Shihad
  - Rick Huntington And Alan Jansson – How Bizarre (OMC)

See: 1997 in music

=== Performing arts ===
- Benny Award presented by the Variety Artists Club of New Zealand to Paul Bennett.

=== Radio and television ===
- CanWest takes complete ownership of TV3 and launches TV4.
- TVNZ broadcasts MTV.
- July: Prime Television in Australia purchases 34 licences covering all major New Zealand centres.

See: 1997 in New Zealand television, 1997 in television, List of TVNZ television programming, Category:Television in New Zealand, TV3 (New Zealand), Category:New Zealand television shows, Public broadcasting in New Zealand

=== Film ===
- Lost Valley
- Topless Women Talk About Their Lives

See: Category:1997 film awards, 1997 in film, List of New Zealand feature films, Cinema of New Zealand, Category:1997 films

=== Internet ===
See: NZ Internet History

== Sport ==
=== Athletics ===
- Peter Buske wins his first national title in the men's marathon, clocking 2:20:49 on 8 March in New Plymouth, while Terri-Lee Farr claims her first in the women's championship (2:55:20).
- Beatrice Faumuina became the first New Zealander to win an event at a World Athletics Championships.

=== Basketball ===
- The Men's NBL was won by the Auckland Stars
- Tall Blacks

=== Cricket ===
- Various Tours, New Zealand cricket team

=== Golf ===
- New Zealand Open won by Greg Turner

=== Horse racing ===
==== Harness racing ====
- New Zealand Trotting Cup: Iraklis
- Auckland Trotting Cup: Kate's First

=== Netball ===
- Silver Ferns
- National Bank Cup

=== Rugby league ===
- The Auckland Warriors competed in the breakaway Super League and finished 7th out of 10 teams.
- Waikato won the Super League Challenge Cup, defeating Canterbury 34–18 in the final. Waikato also won the Rugby League Cup.
- 25 April, New Zealand lost to Australia 22–34
- 26 September, New Zealand defeated Australia 30-12

=== Rugby union ===
- Super 12
- Rugby World Cup
- National Provincial Championship
- Bledisloe Cup
- Tri Nations Series
- Ranfurly Shield

=== Shooting ===
- Ballinger Belt – Ross Geange (Masterton)

=== Soccer ===
- The Chatham Cup is won by Central United who beat Napier City Rovers 3–2 in the final (after extra time).

== Births ==
=== January–February ===
- 3 January – Jacob Cowley, rugby union player
- 7 January – Dylan Schmidt, trampolinist
- 10 January – Patrick Herbert, rugby league player
- 20 January – James Munro, motor racing driver
- 21 January – Josh Clarkson, cricketer
- 23 January – Duncan Campbell, snowboarder
- 24 January
  - Hailey Duff, Scottish curler
  - Jordan Uelese, rugby union player
- 3 February – Paige Hourigan, tennis player
- 11 February – Rosé, singer and member of South Korean girl group Blackpink
- 12 February
  - Anna Grimaldi, athlete
  - Clayton Lewis, association footballer
- 13 February – Sevu Reece, rugby union player
- 17 February – Jordie Barrett, rugby union player

=== March–April ===
- 1 March
  - Nick Kwant, cricketer
  - Niccolo Tagle, badminton player
- 3 March – Du'Plessis Kirifi, rugby union player
- 5 March – Kemara Hauiti-Parapara, rugby union player
- 11 March – Ata Hingano, rugby league player
- 12 March – Stephen Perofeta, rugby union player
- 13 March – Orbyn Leger, rugby union player
- 14 March – Sam Dobbs, cyclist
- 18 March – Rieko Ioane, rugby union player
- 19 March – Zak Gibson, cricketer
- 20 March – Bobby Cheng, chess player
- 21 March – Moses Dyer, association footballer
- 23 March – Sirocco, kākāpō
- 8 April – Ella Greenslade, rower
- 20 April – Luke Jacobson, rugby union player
- 23 April – Myer Bevan, association footballer
- 24 April – Lydia Ko, golfer
- 26 April – Tima Fainga'anuku, rugby union player
- 30 April
  - Daisy Cleverley, association footballer
  - Sam Lane, field hockey player

=== May–June ===
- 1 May – Terina Te Tamaki, rugby union player
- 2 May – Aotearoa Mata'u, rugby union player
- 5 May – Asafo Aumua, rugby union player
- 6 May – Carlos Garcia Knight, snowboarder
- 7 May – Harry Allan, rugby union player
- 8 May
  - Tahuna Irwin, darts player
  - Amanda Jamieson, cyclist
- 13 May – Ngatokotoru Arakua, rugby league player
- 23 May – Sam Timmins, basketball player
- 24 May – Olivia Podmore, cyclist (died 2021)
- 30 May
  - Ere Enari, rugby union player
  - Sitili Tupouniua, rugby league player
- 5 June – Ross ter Braak, cricketer
- 8 June – James Rolleston, actor
- 11 June – Marino Mikaele-Tu'u, rugby union player
- 17 June
  - KJ Apa, actor
  - Pouri Rakete-Stones, rugby union player
- 28 June – Henry Cameron, association footballer

=== July–August ===
- 5 July – Abigail Latu-Meafou, netball player
- 9 July – Grace Anderson, cyclist
- 16 July
  - Braydon Ennor, rugby union player
  - Isaia Walker-Leawere, rugby union player
- 5 August – Clara van Wel, singer–songwriter
- 6 August – Noah Billingsley, association footballer
- 12 August – Elizabeth Cui, diver
- 19 August – Alex Fidow, rugby union player
- 21 August – Sione Katoa, rugby league player

=== September–October ===
- 9 September – Erin Clark, rugby league player
- 10 September – Jacob Pierce, rugby union player
- 11 September – Zoe Hobbs, sprinter
- 16 September – Martine Puketapu, association footballer
- 17 September – Christian Leopard, cricketer
- 21 September – Maia Wilson, netball player
- 27 September – Hail, Thoroughbred racehorse
- 30 September – Ryan Coxon, rugby union player
- 1 October
  - Troy Johnson, cricketer
  - Sam Verlinden, singer
- 8 October – Taniela Paseka, rugby league player
- 10 October – Josh McKay, rugby union player
- 11 October – Dalton Papalii, rugby union player
- 23 October – Jaydn Su'A, rugby league player
- 30 October – Abbie Palmer, squash player

=== November–December ===
- 1 November – Kimiora Poi, netball player
- 4 November – Bryony Botha, cyclist
- 16 November – Ethereal, Thoroughbred racehorse
- 21 November – Caleb Aekins, rugby league player
- 26 November – Tamati Tua, rugby union player
- 7 December – Briton Nikora, rugby league player
- 15 December – Stefania Owen, actor
- 27 December – Jona Nareki, rugby union player
- 31 December
  - Peter Umaga-Jensen, rugby union player
  - Thomas Umaga-Jensen, rugby union player

== Deaths ==
=== January–March ===
- 1 January – Nora Crawford, police officer (born 1917)
- 2 January – Keith Hay, construction company founder, politician, conservative activist (born 1917)
- 10 January – John Rodgers, Roman Catholic bishop (born 1915)
- 15 January – Ted Smith, rower (born 1922)
- 29 January – Sir Clifford Richmond, jurist (born 1914)
- 2 February – Ray Dalton, rugby union player (born 1919)
- 26 March – Sir Norman Alexander, physics academic, university administrator (born 1907)

=== April–June ===
- 8 April – Lord Module, Standardbred racehorse (foaled 1974)
- 10 April – Sir Robert Aitken, medical academic, university administrator (born 1901)
- 14 April – Count Geoffrey Potocki de Montalk, poet, pretender to the Polish throne (born 1903)
- 17 April – Henry Lang, public servant, economics academic (born 1919)
- 24 April – Hugh McLean, rugby union player (born 1907)
- 25 April – Terry O'Sullivan, rugby union player (born 1936)
- 3 May – Bruce Beetham, politician (born 1936)
- 7 May – Owen Jensen, musician, composer, music critic and broadcaster (born 1907)
- 17 May – James Newhook, veterinary science academic (born 1915)
- 21 May – Sir Tristram, thoroughbred racehorse (foaled 1971)
- 22 May – Rachael Zister, Māori community leader (born 1893)
- 2 June – Oscar Garden, aviator (born 1903)
- 14 June – Sir Jack Hunn, public servant (born 1906)
- 15 June – Kim Casali, cartoonist (born 1941)
- 26 June – Dent Harper, cricketer (born 1937)
- 28 June – Jack Hinton, soldier (born 1909)
- 29 June – Ian Clarke, rugby union player, referee and administrator (born 1931)

=== July–September ===
- 3 July – Ron Westerby, rugby league player (born 1920)
- 6 July – Brun Smith, cricketer (born 1922)
- 8 July – Ray Speed, association football player (born 1914)
- 12 July – Frank Shuter, speedway rider (born 1943)
- 23 July – David Warbeck, actor (born 1941)
- 25 July
  - Jack Davies, swimmer (born 1916)
  - Matiu Rata, politician (born 1934)
- 31 July – Sir Hepi Te Heuheu, Māori leader (born 1919)
- 15 August – Dave Solomon, rugby union and league player (born 1913)
- 16 August – Kitty Kain, dietician, WAAF leader (born 1908)
- 21 August – Jean Horsley, artist (born 1913)
- 25 August – James Gould, rower (born 1914)
- 5 September – Emily Schuster, master weaver (born 1927)
- 17 September – Trevor Redmond, speedway rider (born 1927)
- 22 September – Silver Lad, thoroughbred racehorse (foaled 1973)
- 23 September – Christopher John Lewis, criminal (born 1964)
- 26 September – Geoff Gerard, politician (born 1904)

=== October–December ===
- 8 October – Desmond Scott, fighter pilot (born 1918)
- 11 October – Sidney Koreneff, French resistance worker, newspaper managing director, Anglican priest (born 1918)
- 18 October
  - David Seath, politician (born 1914)
  - Geoff Walker, canoeist, surf lifesaver (born 1952)
- 31 October – Adrian Rodda, public servant (born 1911)
- 9 November – Margaret Pawson, netball player (born 1940)
- 16 November – Roy Sheffield, cricketer (born 1906)
- 21 November – Stanley Dallas, radio technician and recording engineer (born 1926)
- 27 November – Jim Kershaw, association football player (born 1906)
- 6 December – Eva Rickard, Māori land and women's rights activist (born 1925)
- 10 December – Ted Coubray, filmmaker (born 1900)

== See also ==
- List of years in New Zealand
- Timeline of New Zealand history
- History of New Zealand
- Military history of New Zealand
- Timeline of the New Zealand environment
- Timeline of New Zealand's links with Antarctica

For world events and topics in 1997 not specifically related to New Zealand see: 1997
