= McMurtry =

McMurtry is a surname. Notable people with the surname include:

- Alex McMurtry (born 1996), American artistic gymnast
- Brent McMurtry (born 1986), Canadian cross-country skier
- Caragh McMurtry (born 1991), British rower
- Chuck McMurtry (1937–1984), American football player
- Craig McMurtry (born 1959), American baseball player
- David McMurtry (1940 –2024), Irish businessman, founder of Renishaw plc
- George G. McMurtry (1876–1958), Captain, U.S. Army; received Medal of Honor
- George McMurtry (engineer) (1867–1918), New Zealand scientist
- Grady McMurtry (1918–1985), American occultist
- Greg McMurtry (born 1967), American football player
- James McMurtry (born 1962), American musician
- John McMurtry, Canadian philosopher
- John McMurtry (1812–1890), American architect
- Larry McMurtry (1936–2021), American novelist, father of James
- Michael McMurtry, Canadian actor
- Paul McMurtry (born 1965), American politician
- Robert McMurtry (physician), Canadian physician
- Robert McMurtry (artist) (1950–2012), American painter and writer
- Roy McMurtry (1932–2024), Canadian politician and Chief Justice of Ontario
- Sharon McMurtry (born 1960), American soccer player
- Stanley McMurtry (born 1936), British cartoonist
- Thomas McMurtry (born 1935), American NASA test pilot
- William McMurtry (1801–1875), American politician and military officer

== Other uses ==
- Lake McMurtry, reservoir in Noble County, Oklahoma
- McMurtry Building, Stanford University
- McMurtry Spéirling, a 2021 electric concept car
- Roy McMurtry Youth Centre, Juvenile detention centre in Ontario, Canada
