= 2002 in New Zealand =

- Decades: 1980s; 1990s; 2000s; 2010s; 2020s
- See also: History of New Zealand; List of years in New Zealand; Timeline of New Zealand history

The following lists events that happened during 2002 in New Zealand.

== Population ==
- Estimated population as of 31 December: 3,989,500.
- Increase since 31 December 2001: 73,400 (1.87%).
- Males per 100 Females: 96.2.

== Incumbents ==
=== Regal and viceregal ===
- Head of State – Elizabeth II
- Governor-General – The Hon Dame Silvia Cartwright PCNZM DBE QSO

=== Government ===
The 46th New Zealand Parliament continued until 10 June. Government was The Labour Party led by Helen Clark, In coalition with Alliance, led by Jim Anderton. In the 2002 general election Labour was returned to power, in coalition with The Progressive Party led by Jim Anderton, and backed with supporting supply votes by United Future, led by Peter Dunne.

- Speaker of the House – Jonathan Hunt
- Prime Minister – Helen Clark
- Deputy Prime Minister – Jim Anderton then Michael Cullen
- Minister of Finance – Michael Cullen
- Minister of Foreign Affairs – Phil Goff
- Chief Justice — Sian Elias

=== Opposition leaders ===
See: Category:Parliament of New Zealand, New Zealand elections

- National – Bill English (Leader of the Opposition)
- Greens – Jeanette Fitzsimons and Rod Donald
- Act – Richard Prebble
- New Zealand First – Winston Peters
- United Future – Peter Dunne

=== Main centre leaders ===
- Mayor of Auckland – John Banks
- Mayor of Hamilton – David Braithwaite
- Mayor of Wellington – Kerry Prendergast
- Mayor of Christchurch – Garry Moore
- Mayor of Dunedin – Sukhi Turner

== Events ==
- January – Kiwibank is formed.
- 22–27 February – The Queen visits New Zealand as part of her Golden Jubilee tour. It would be her last visit to New Zealand.
- 21 June – A state of emergency is declared in the Waikato due to flooding. One person dies a few days later.
- 30 June – The population of Canterbury reaches half a million.
- 27 July – 2002 general election; Labour-led government returned for a second term.
- 12 October – Two New Zealand tourists are killed in a series of terrorist bombings in Bali, Indonesia.
- The Big Lemon & Paeroa bottle is moved to the Ohinemuri Reserve.

== Arts and literature ==
- Alison Wong wins the Robert Burns Fellowship.
- Montana New Zealand Book Awards:
  - Montana Medal: Lynley Hood, A City Possessed: The Christchurch Civic Creche Case
  - Deutz Medal: Craig Marriner, Stonedogs
  - Reader's Choice: Lynley Hood, A City Possessed: The Christchurch Civic Creche Case
  - First Book Awards
    - Fiction: Craig Marriner, Stonedogs
    - Poetry: Chris Price, Husk
    - Non-Fiction: Steve Braunias, Fool's Paradise

See 2002 in art, 2002 in literature, Category:2002 books

=== Music ===
==== New Zealand Music Awards ====
Two new categories were introduced this year: 'Best R&B/ Hip Hop Album' and 'Best Electronica Album'. Winners are shown first with nominees underneath.

- Album of the Year: Che Fu – The Navigator
  - Anika Moa – Thinking Room
  - Neil Finn – One Nil
  - Salmonella Dub – Inside The Dub Plates
  - the feelers – Communicate
- Single of the Year: Che Fu – Fade Away
  - Aaria – Kei A Wai Ra Te Kupu
  - Anika Moa – Youthful
  - Nesian Mystik – Nesian Style
  - Salmonella Dub – Love Your Ways
- Top Group: Salmonella Dub – Inside The Dub Plates
  - the feelers – Communicate
  - Zed -Silencer
- Top New Act: Goodshirt – Good
  - K'Lee – Broken Wings
  - Pluto – Red Light Syndrome
- Top Male Vocalist: Che Fu – Navigator
  - Neil Finn – One Nil
  - Tiki Taane – Inside The Dubplates
- Top Female Vocalist: Anika Moa – Thinking Room
  - Boh Runga – Magic Line
  - Hayley Westenra – Hayley Westenra
- Best Folk Album: Bob Mcneill – Covenant
  - Beverley Young – The Tinkerman's Daughter
  - Jacky Tarr – Defenestration
  - Phil Garland – Swag O'Dreams
- Best R&B/ Hip Hop Album (new category): Che Fu – Navigator
  - Dark Tower – Canterbury Drafts
- Best Music Video: Matthew Metcalfe / Greg Rewai – Fade Away (Che Fu)
  - Garry Sullivan – Seed (Dimmer)
  - Ed Davis and Paul McLaney -Complicated (Gramsci)
- Outstanding International Achievement: Salmonella Dub
  - Nathan Haines
  - Anika Moa
- Best Mana Maori Album: Ruia And Ranea – Waiata of Bob Marley
  - Brannigan Kaa – Taputapu
  - T-Sistaz – Whakamanahia
- Best Mana Reo Album: Rangiatea -Rangiatea Concert Party
  - Ruia and Ranea – Waiata of Bob Marley
  - Te Ati Kimihia – Te Ati Kimihia and The Children of Tane
- Best Country Album: The Topp Twins – Grass Highway
  - Beau Redding – Dime Box
  - Dennis Marsh – Faded Love
- Best Cast Recording/Compilation: Greg Johnson – The Best Yet
  - Th' Dudes – Where Are Th' Girls
  - Various – Live at Helen's
- Best Producer: Tom Bailey & Stellar* – Magic Line (Stellar*)
  - Malcolm Welsford – Scorpio Writing (Garageland)
  - Paddy Free & Salmonella Dub – Inside The Dub Plates (Salmonella Dub)
- Best Engineer: Dave Wernham, Tiki Taane And Paddy Free – 'Inside The Dub Plates' (Salmonella Dub)
  - Luke Tomes – Magic Line (Stellar*)
  - Simon Holloway – Broken Wings (K-Lee)
- Best Electronica Album (new category): Sola Rosa – Solarized
  - Rhian Sheehan – Paradigm Shift
  - Shapeshifter – Real Time
- Best Jazz Album: C L Bob – Stereoscope
  - Nathan Haines – Sound Travels
  - The Rodger Fox Big Band – Warriors
- Best Gospel Album: The Lads – Marvel
  - Felt – Colour of the Sky
  - Parachute Band – Amazing
- Best Children's Album: Fatcat & Fishface – Dog Breath
  - Kids Music Company Singers – On A High Note II
  - Michelle Scullion – Peaks To Plains
- Best Classical Album: Jack Body – Pulse
  - New Zealand Symphony Orchestra – Landscapes
  - Gareth Farr – Warriors From Pluto
- Best Songwriter: Anika Moa – Youthful
  - Che Fu – Fade Away
  - James Reid and Donald Reid – Communicate (The Feelers)
- Best Cover Design: Kelvin Soh – Good (Goodshirt)
  - Che Fu and Kelvin Soh – Navigator (Che Fu)
  - Shayne Carter and Andrew B White – I Believe You Are A Star (Dimmer)
- New Zealand Radio Programmer Award: Brad King – The Rock Network
  - Dallas Gurney – ZM Network
  - David Ridler – Channel Z
  - Marty Lindsay – Star FM Wanganui

See: 2002 in music

=== Performing arts ===
- Benny Award presented by the Variety Artists Club of New Zealand to Tom Sharplin.

=== Dance ===
- 7–24 January: Inaugural Footnote Choreolab runs in Wellington under the direction of Deirdre Tarrant and guest choreographer Justin Rutzou (Australia) with New Zealand choreographers Kristian Larsen and Jacob Sullivan and 22 dancers from throughout New Zealand.
- 30 January – 3 February, Jan Bolwell premieres her theatre work Standing On My Hands at BATS Theatre, Wellington, subsequently touring it throughout New Zealand over the course of the year.
- 20–21 February, Footnote Dance Company premieres Banding Together 2002, a programme of short works by choreographers Michael Parmenter, Merenia Gray, Raewyn Hill, subsequently touring this programme throughout New Zealand. The dancers are: Annabel Reader, Tane Duncan, Melissa Tate, Georgina White, Tim Fletcher and Paora Taurima.
- 15–17 March, Inland by Douglas Wright Dance Company, premieres at the NZ International Festival of the Arts who commissioned the work. Subsequently, the work tours to Dunedin, Christchurch and Auckland to considerable acclaim.
- 19 April to 5 May, the Auckland Dance Festival (later rebranded as Tempo Dance Festival) runs throughout the month at a number of Auckland venues, presenting professional and community performances, classes, workshops, and public participatory events. Events include: Shake a Leg Youth Dance performances at ASB Theatre; Platform 2002 choreographic development project at UNITEC; Dancing City to City, ESCAPE by Black Grace Urban Youth Movement, Polished Up at St Kevins Arcade, Prayers in the Forest of Mirrors by Edna Katz-Levy at the Maidment Studio, Scratch 'n Sniff Dance Shorts, a mixed bill of dance films, short works and improvisational performances curated by Wilhimeena Gordon at Woonton's Lane in Titirangi, Sub-urban Legends by Atamira Dance Collective at UNITEC Studios, Living Room (short works by Melanie Turner, Becca Wood, Karen Barbour, Katie Burton, and film by Alyx Duncan) at UNITEC Studios, and Still Life 2002, a triple bill by Sean Curham (Speedy Horse and Royal Crown plus excerpts from the Perfect Lie) at the Dorothy Winston Centre.
- 19–22 April, MEDANZ Festival in Christchurch
- On 3 May, Creative New Zealand launches {https://web.archive.org/web/20140726175934/http://www.creativenz.govt.nz/en/news/creative-new-zealand-launches-contemporary-dance-strategy Moving to the Future: Ngä Whakanekeneke atu ki te Ao o Apöpö], a strategy for professional contemporary dance with specific funding support for emerging artists.
- On 16 June, the Mandelbrot Set presents another in their bi-monthly series of improvisational performances at The Space in Newtown, in Wellington – dancers are Lyne Pringle, Kristian Larsen and Emily Kerr with local musicians.
- The rising of Matariki is formally marked with performance installations in Auckland under the title Cluster. Soundscore and imagery by Karl Chitham, performance devised and facilitated by Louise Potiki Bryant and by Light/off-site Productions with performers Corinna Hunziker, Dolina Wehipeihana, Maaka Pepene, Justine Hohaia, Karl Chitham, and Cathy Livermore (from Atamira Dance Collective).
- 28–29 June in Hamilton and 10–13 July in Auckland, the double bill Fracture: Reality is Fragile choreographed by Guy Ryan, and Weather Vain People choreographed by Malia Johnston is presented. Dancers were Natasha Alpe, Kerryn McMurdo, Alexa Wilson, Jenny Nichols, Geoff Gilson, Guy Ryan, Stu Armstrong.
- During July, the NZ International Film Festival features a programme of NZ dance films with premieres of Fly by Shona McCullagh, Canopy by Mary Jane O'Reilly, Asylum by Wilhimeena Gordon, Wireless by Daniel Belton, and Rover by Morag Brownlie. Fly subsequently wins Official Selection for Clermond-Ferrand 2002, Winner of both the Reeldance Award and People's Choice Awards, Australia 2002
- NZ School of Dance turns 35 and marks the occasion with a weekend of open performances; Student choreography season Finding Jimmy is presented at Te Whaea.
- Premiere season of WHITE by Raewyn Hill (with dancers Sarah-Jayne Howard and Sarah Sproull and dramaturg Duncan Sarkies) running from 24 July – 4 August at Bats, Wellington.
- "Black Grace & Friends at Sky City". The New Zealand Herald. Archived from the original on 25 July 2020. is a season of short works and two significant events for the company. Female "guest" dancers perform with the company for the first time and the gender differences between the male and female dancers are the subject for Ieremia's new Human Language. A choreographer from outside the company is commissioned for the first time—Daniel Belton creates Whai, a kinetic sculptural work with stage-wide elastic bands manipulated by the dancers. A third work by dancer Taiaroa Royal marks the passing of his father.
- The September Dance Your Sox Off festival in Wellington includes four dance seasons by professional dancers: Raewyn Hill premieres When Love Comes Calling from 4–7 September at Bats, subsequently touring to Christchurch, Dunedin and Auckland; Native is presented by Leonie Douglas and the Epitome Company (Sean McDonald, Seonaid Lyons and Claire Barret) with sound design by Blackbridge Productions – musicians Andrew McMillan and Paul Stanley, and live triggering of sound and lighting, a STAB Commission at BATS; Streamline Danceworks present new works by Leigh Evans, Angela Westerby, THROW Disposable Choreography (aka Kristian Larsen), Anne Anderson and Kay Muir, at Bats Theatre, 11–14 September; and The Mandelbrot Set presents another evening of improv contemporary dance and music at The Space, Newtown. 13 Sept. Performers: Lyne Pringle, Sarah Sproull, Emily Kerr and 5 musicians.
- In Auckland, on 13 September, emerging choreographic collective Fresh Produce perform their inaugural Vacuum Packed show at Kingsland central as a fundraiser, departing on tour the next day to present their show in Nelson, Christchurch and Dunedin.
- In Christchurch, The Body dance & physical theatre festival – workshops & performances runs from 13 to 29 September and includes 10 professional productions: Closed Circuit Orbit (touring from Wellington); Footnote's Banding Together 2002 (touring from Wellington); Poised by Hagley Dance Company; Vacuum Packed (7 short works touring from Auckland), Standing on My Hands by Jan Bolwell (touring from Wellington); Raewyn Hill's When Love Comes Calling (touring from Wellington); the Danceworks 2002 development project presents new short works by Richard Bullock and Shay Horay (for Ricochet Predicament), Sarah Franks, Sheryl Robinson (for Local Weeds), Andrew Shepherd, Fleur de Thier (for Scrambled Legs), Megan Platt, Julia Sadler (for Fresh Produce), and Sally Williams,(for the clinic); Slow Stride Eyes Open by Scrambled Legs; Wilderness/Weather by Michael Parmenter with Sarah-Jayne Howard (touring from Wellington), and three dance films by Daniel Belton – Lumin, Henge and Wireless.
- In Auckland on 21 September, the 2002 Aotearoa Hip Hop Summit takes over at The Edge – 8 crews battle in finals, plus workshops and performances throughout the day. That same weekend, Axess Interdisciplinary Collective (Kerryn McMurdo, Brent Harris, and Alexa Wilson) hold a fundraiser at MIC with guests Prue Cunningham, Mark Harvey, Dion Hitchens, Val Smith, Dianna Brinsden, Charles Koroneho, Wilhemeena Gordon, DJ Joe Fish vs Krutov.
- Mika Haka tours the country on return from the Edinburgh Festival.
- In Auckland, Touch Compass takes to the big stage of the ASB Theatre for the first time on 28–29 September with a major new dance theatre work, Lighthouse co-developed by Catherine Chappell and Christian Penny with the cast. This subsequently tours to Tauranga and is recognised as a major highlight of the dance year.
- Black Grace launches a season of short New Works by company members in Wellington at Te Whaea on 24 September, subsequently touring throughout New Zealand before closing in Auckland on 30 November
- During October, two major awards are made to New Zealand choreographers – Shona McCullagh becomes a Laureate of the Arts Foundation, and Raewyn Hill winning an AMP Scholarship for international travel and study.
- "The Carlisle House Project". The New Zealand Herald. was a site specific project presented in two semi-derelict buildings on Richmond Road, Auckland. Produced by Michele Powles with choreography by Lou Potiki Bryant, Geoff Gilson, Vicky Kapo, Cathy Livermoore, Michele Powles, and Strange Fruit (Alyx Duncan and Maria Dabrowska).
- In Wellington, Propulsion presented Black Body: a multi-sensory design journey involving dance theatre, literature and theatrical technology. Dancers were Kilda Northcott, Lyne Pringle and Sarah Sproull with Jean Betts, Edward Davis, David Holmes, Gabe McDonnell, Ciara Mulholland, Peter Petrovich, Lizz Santos, Heidi Simmonds, Alana Spragg, Annemiek Weterings. A STAB commission 13–23 November at Bats.
- And in Dunedin, a week long creative workshop for dancers and photographers was led by choreographer Carol Brown and photographer Mattias Ek, 12–17 November. Subsequently, a week later, Wilderness/Weather by Michael Parmenter with Sarah-Jayne Howard was also presented in Dunedin.

=== Radio and television ===
- 29 April: Ian Fraser becomes CEO of TVNZ.

See: 2002 in New Zealand television, 2002 in television, List of TVNZ television programming, Category:Television in New Zealand, TV3 (New Zealand), Category:New Zealand television shows, Public broadcasting in New Zealand

=== Film ===
- The Lord of the Rings: The Return of the King
- Tongan Ninja

See: Category:2002 film awards, 2002 in film, List of New Zealand feature films, Cinema of New Zealand, Category:2002 films

=== Internet ===
See: NZ Internet History

== Sport ==
- See: 2002 in sports, Category:2002 in sports

=== Athletics ===
- Mark Bright wins his first national title in the men's marathon, clocking 2:29:24 on 27 April in Rotorua, while Bernardine Portenski claims her third in the women's championship (3:01:36).

=== Basketball ===
- The NBL was won by the Waikato Titans who beat the Nelson Giants 85–83 in the final
- The Waikato Lady Titans won the Women's NBL, beating the Canterbury Wildcats 88–60 in the final.

=== Commonwealth Games ===
Gold	Silver	Bronze	Total
11	13	21	45

=== Cricket ===
- Cricket: Various Tours, New Zealand cricket team, Chappell–Hadlee Trophy

=== Golf ===
See New Zealand Open, Check Category:New Zealand golfers in overseas tournaments.

=== Horse racing ===
==== Harness racing ====
- New Zealand Trotting Cup – Gracious Knight
- Auckland Trotting Cup – Young Rufus
- New Zealand Free For All – Yulestar

=== Netball ===
see Silver Ferns, National Bank Cup ,

=== Olympics ===
- New Zealand sends a team of 10 competitors in five sports.

Gold	Silver	Bronze	Total
0	0	0	0

=== Paralympic Games ===
- New Zealand sends a team of two competitors in one sport.

Gold	Silver	Bronze	Total
4	0	2	6

=== Rugby union ===
- Rugby: Category:Rugby union in New Zealand, Super 14, Rugby World Cup, National Provincial Championship, Category:All Blacks, Bledisloe Cup, Tri Nations Series, Ranfurly Shield

=== Rugby league ===
- The New Zealand Warriors had their best season ever in the Australian NRL competition, winning the Minor Premiership and making the Grand Final, which they lost to the Sydney Roosters, 30–8
- The Bartercard Cup was won by the Mt Albert Lions who defeated the Hibiscus Coast Raiders 24–20 in the grand final, the last match ever played at Carlaw Park.
- The New Zealand national rugby league team played in six test matches, winning three and drawing one:
  - 12 October – Lost to Australia 24–32;
  - 3 November – Defeated Wales 50–22;
  - 9 November – Defeated Great Britain 30–16;
  - 16 November – Drew with Great Britain 14–all;
  - 23 November – Lost to Great Britain 10–16;
  - 30 November – Defeated France 22–14.

=== Shooting ===
- Ballinger Belt – Trevor Oliver (Onslow)

=== Soccer ===
- The All Whites won the OFC Nations Cup held in Auckland, beating Australia 1–0 in the final. This qualified the team for the 2003 FIFA Confederations Cup in Mexico.
- New Zealand National Soccer League was won by Miramar Rangers
- The Chatham Cup is won by Napier City Rovers who beat Tauranga City United 2–0 in the final.

== Births ==
=== January–June ===
- 23 January – Henrietta Christie, racing cyclist
- 29 January – George Bell, rugby union player
- 4 February – Ben Barclay, freestyle skier
- 7 February – Grace Nweke, netball player
- 11 February – Liam Lawson, motor racing driver
- 19 February – Marko Stamenic, association footballer
- 25 February – Luke Wijohn, activist
- 2 March – Liana Mikaele-Tu'u, rugby union player
- 12 March – Riley Bidois, association footballer
- 27 March – Marisa van der Meer, association footballer
- 4 April – Naufahu Whyte, rugby league player
- 13 April – Matthew Garbett, association footballer
- 14 April – Oskar van Hattum, association footballer
- 18 April – Ava Collins, association footballer
- 19 April – Taine Murray, basketball player
- 28 April – Tim Robinson, cricketer
- 1 May – Matthew Payne, rugby union player
- 10 May – Cool Wakushima, snowboarder
- 25 May – Campbell Wright, biathlete
- 2 June – Fonua Pole, rugby league player
- 3 June – Beckham Wheeler-Greenall, cricketer
- 11 June – Mojave King, basketball player

=== July–December ===
- 4 July – Alex Paulsen, association footballer
- 17 July – Laurence Pithie, racing cyclist
- 20 July – Maldivian, Thoroughbred racehorse
- 27 July – Stella Ashcroft, artistic gymnast
- 31 July – Keegan Jelacic, association footballer
- 2 August – Xavier Willison, rugby league player
- 13 August – Ben Old, association footballer
- 17 August – Michael Pickett, swimmer
- 17 September – Vosne Romanee, Thoroughbred racehorse
- 21 September – Darci Brahma, Thoroughbred racehorse
- 3 October
  - Monkey King, Standardbred racehorse
  - Matthew Payne, motor racing driving
- 16 October – Julian Dennison, actor
- 5 November – Jawsh 685 beat maker and music producer
- 7 November – Wahid, Thoroughbred racehorse
- 14 November – Seachange, Thoroughbred racehorse
- 20 December – Billy Frazer, racing driver
- 2 December – Master O'Reilly, Thoroughbred racehorse
- 12 December – Sydnee Andrews, judoka

== Deaths ==
=== January–March ===
- 3 January – Jack Skinner, association football player (born 1915)
- 12 February – Ossie Johnson, triple jumper (born 1906)
- 13 February – Mike Gilbert, rugby union and rugby league player (born 1911)
- 15 February – Kevin Smith, actor (born 1963)
- 22 February
  - Sir Raymond Firth, ethnologist (born 1901)
  - Allen Johnston, Anglican bishop (born 1912)
- 23 February – Ossie Butt, rugby league player, selector and administrator (born 1934)
- 6 March – Richard Dell, malacologist (born 1920)
- 9 March – Gordon Hunter, rugby union player, coach and selector (born 1949)
- 12 March – Empire Rose, thoroughbred racehorse (foaled 1982)
- 14 March – Cherry Grimm, fantasy and science-fiction writer under the pseudonym Cherry Wilder (born 1930)
- 26 March – Roy Calvert, World War II pilot (born 1913)
- 27 March – Geoffrey Sim, politician (born 1911)
- 29 March – John Dick, rugby union player (born 1912)

=== April–June ===
- 2 April – Mona Leydon, swimmer (born 1915)
- 27 April – Lachie Grant, rugby union player (born 1923)
- 29 April – Jack Kelly, rugby union player, schoolteacher (born 1926)
- 2 May – Ross Smith, rugby union player (born 1929)
- 19 May – Herbert Familton, alpine skier (born 1928)
- 28 May – Norman King, politician (born 1914)
- 31 May – Roy Blair, cricketer (born 1921)
- 3 June – Sir Edward Somers, jurist (born 1928)
- 10 June – Dick Brittenden, cricket writer (born 1919)
- 26 June – Yvonne Rust, potter (born 1922)
- 27 June
  - Alan Brunton, poet and playwright (born 1946)
  - Barry Smith, preacher and author (born 1933)

=== July–September ===
- 9 July – Ron Scarlett, paleozoologist (born 1911)
- 23 July – Bill Bell, cricketer (born 1931)
- 3 August
  - Arthur Cresswell, cricketer (born 1917)
  - Joyce Sullivan, netball player (born 1918)
- 24 August – Alan Brash, church leader (born 1913)
- 29 August – Betty Forbes, athlete (born 1916)
- 9 September – Graham Kennedy, rugby league player and coach (born 1939)
- 24 September – Ron Jeffery, World War II spy (born 1917)
- 27 September – Bill Pearson, writer, critic, English literature academic (born 1922)

=== October–December ===
- 1 October – Ernest Bezzant, cricketer (born 1916)
- 3 October – Dalvanius Prime, entertainer (born 1948)
- 11 October – Betty Molesworth Allen, botanist (born 1913)
- 12 October
  - Stanley James, cricketer (born 1932)
  - Mark Parker, cricketer (born 1975)
- 13 October – Sir Garfield Todd, missionary, politician (born 1908)
- 18 October – Buddy Lucas, swimmer and surf lifesaver (born 1931)
- 23 October – David Lewis, sailor, explorer (born 1917)
- 28 October – Hyperno, thoroughbred racehorse (foaled 1973)
- 15 November
  - Betty Plant, netball player, coach and administrator, heritage campaigner (born 1920)
  - JJ Stewart, rugby union coach, selector and administrator (born 1923)
- 19 November – Gladys Pidgeon, swimmer (born 1906)
- 20 November – Rod Heeps, rugby union player (born 1938)
- 9 December – Alister Atkinson, rugby league player (born 1925)
- 22 December – Joe Morgan, rugby union player (born 1945)
- 25 December – Davina Whitehouse, actor (born 1912)
- 29 December – Don Clarke, rugby union player (born 1933)

== See also ==
- List of years in New Zealand
- Timeline of New Zealand history
- History of New Zealand
- Military history of New Zealand
- Timeline of the New Zealand environment
- Timeline of New Zealand's links with Antarctica
