= George Stephenson (disambiguation) =

George Stephenson (1781–1848) was an English engineer, known as the "Father of Railways".

George Stephenson may also refer to:

- George Stephenson (footballer, born 1900) (1900–1971), England international footballer, later manager at Huddersfield Town
- George Stephenson (footballer, born 1865) (1865–?), English footballer for Everton
- George Stephenson (impresario) (1874–1918), New Zealand impresario, auctioneer, rugby footballer (1890s)
- George Stephenson (politician) (1814–1878), American politician from Maryland
- George Stephenson (rugby union) (1901–1970), Ireland international rugby union player
- Bob Stephenson (sportsman) (George Robert Stephenson, born 1942), English cricketer, son of the above
- George Robert Stephenson (1819–1905), British civil engineer
- George Stephenson (Confederate Marine), American and Confederate soldier who served in the American Civil War

== See also ==
- Stephenson College, Durham, formerly known as George Stephenson College, named after the civil engineer
- George Stephenson High School, Killingworth, England
- George Stevenson (disambiguation)
