= John McMurtry =

John McMurtry may refer to:

- John McMurtry (academic), professor of philosophy at the University of Guelph
- John McMurtry (architect) (1812–1890), American builder and architect who worked in Lexington, Kentucky
- John McMurtry (actor), American actor

== See also ==
- McMurtry : surname list
