= Robert McMurtry =

Robert McMurtry may refer to:

- Robert McMurtry (physician), physician and special advisor
- Robert McMurtry (artist), American painter and writer
