= Arthur Jensen (disambiguation) =

Arthur Jensen (1923–2012) was a professor of educational psychology.

Arthur Jensen may also refer to:

- Arthur Owen Jensen, musician, music tutor and promoter, critic, broadcaster, composer
- Arthur Jensen (actor), Danish actor
- Arthur Jensen (oboist), see List of oboists
- Arthur Jensen (skier), see 1937 Workers' Winter Olympiad
