= George McMurtry =

George McMurtry may refer to:

- George G. McMurtry (1876–1958), officer in United States Army and Medal of Honor recipient
- George McMurtry (engineer) (1867–1918), New Zealand scientist, smelting engineer and mining manager
