= Daniel Watkins =

Daniel Watkins may refer to:

- Daniel Watkins (businessman) (1918–1982), New Zealand agrochemical distributor, manufacturer and businessman
- Daniel Watkins (canoeist) (born 1995), Australian slalom canoeist
- Danny Watkins (born 1984), American football player
