= Morris, Oklahoma =

- City
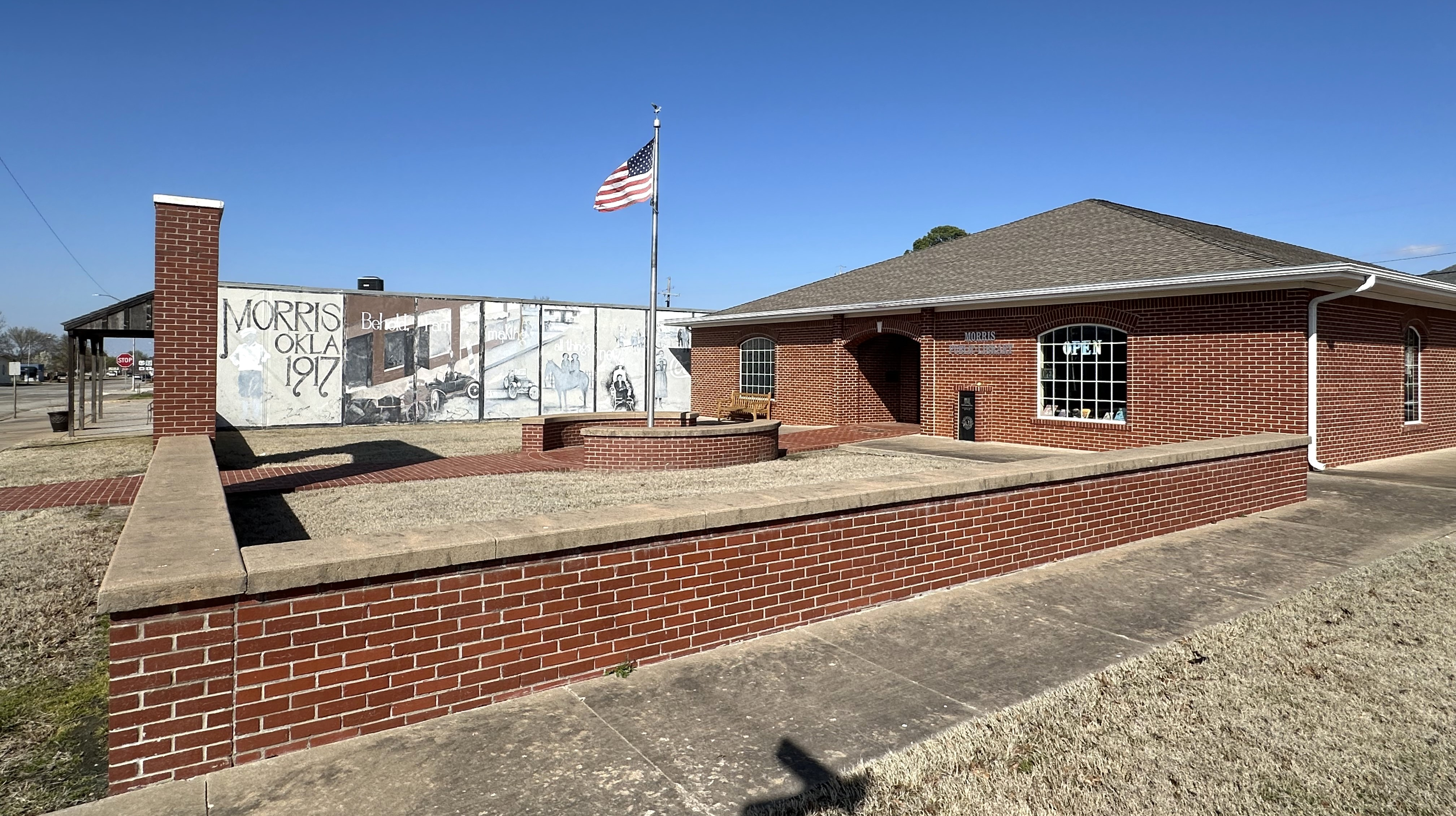
- Morris Public Library and town mural. The lettering says “Morris Okla 1917,” and “Behold I am making all things new.”
- Motto: The Little City With a Big Welcome
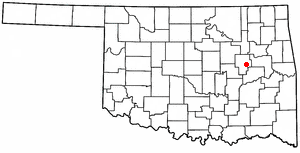
- Location of Morris, Oklahoma
- Coordinates: 35°36′25″N 95°51′40″W
- Country: United States
- State: Oklahoma
- County: Okmulgee

Area
  - Total: 1.27 sq mi (3.30 km^{2})
  - Land: 1.22 sq mi (3.16 km^{2})
  - Water: 0.054 sq mi (0.14 km^{2})
- Elevation: 722 ft (220 m)

Population (2020)
  - Total: 1,299
  - Density: 1,064.7/sq mi (411.08/km^{2})
- Time zone: UTC-6 (Central (CST))
  - Summer (DST): UTC-5 (CDT)
- ZIP code: 74445
- Area codes: 539/918
- FIPS code: 40-49400
- GNIS feature ID: 2411168
- Website: cityofmorrisok.gov

Morris is a city in Okmulgee County, Oklahoma, United States. The population was 1,299 at the 2020 census.

== History ==
The community began as a cattle stop on the Ozark and Cherokee Central Railway (later the St. Louis and San Francisco Railway, commonly known as the "Frisco"), which ran between Muskogee and Okmulgee. The post office was established here on January 4, 1904.

The townsite was platted in 1904 by L. R. Kershaw, who was an attorney and an immigration agent for the Frisco. He named the town after H. E. Morris, a Frisco executive. Many of the street names in Morris are named after towns that were familiar to Kershaw from his home state of Illinois. Kershaw was also the founder of two of the earliest banks in Morris, Indian Territory: The Farmer's State Bank of Morris in 1905 and the First National Bank of Morris in 1907. Morris's later history includes bank robberies, the most talked about being those by Charles Arthur "Pretty Boy" Floyd, who was popular in the Morris area.

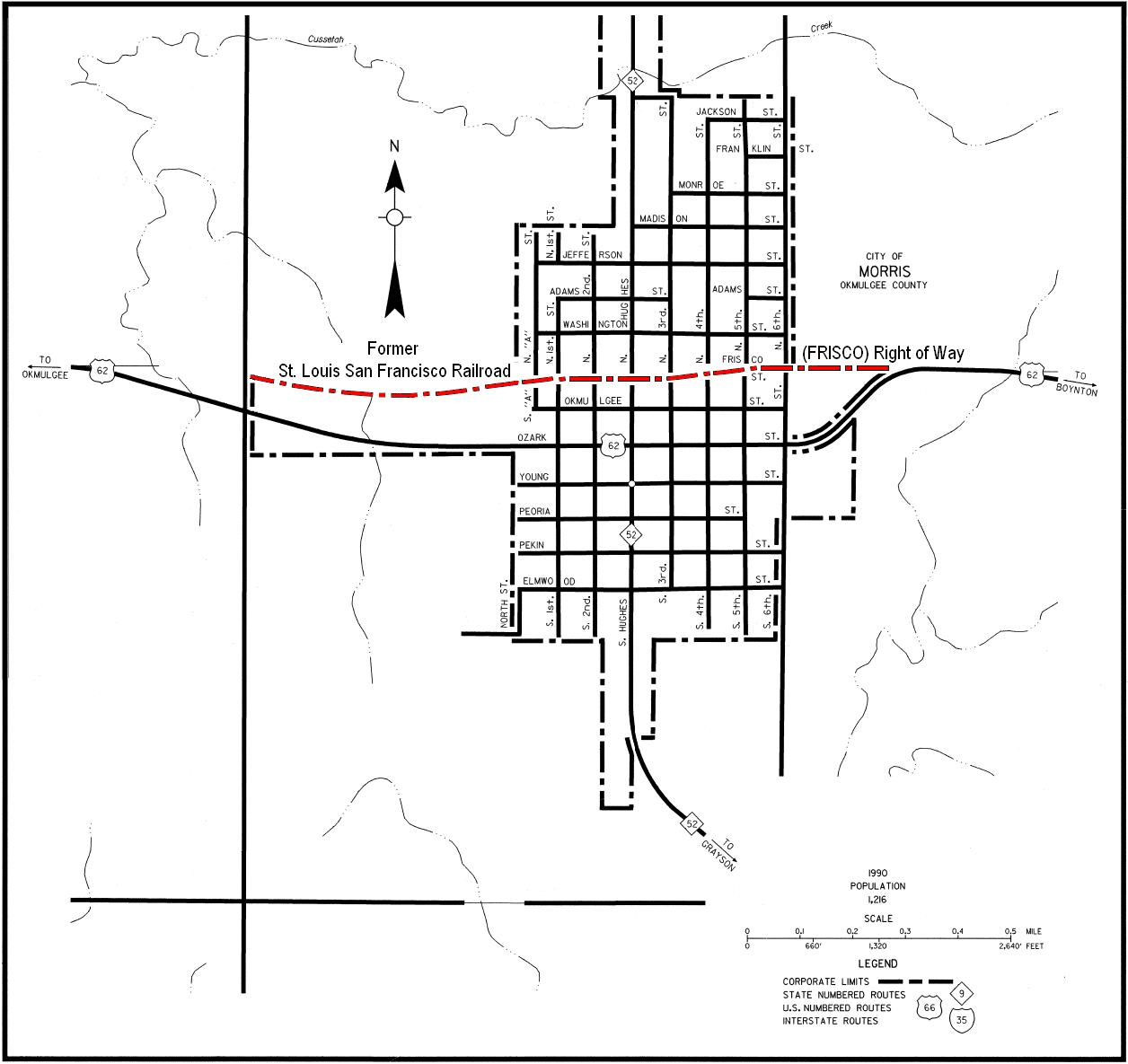
Morris, Oklahoma, map with Frisco Railroad right of way

The Morris News, a newspaper founded in 1910, continued publication into the 21st century, but ceased publishing in January 2020.

The large early growth in Morris's history came from mineral extraction. Coal lay close to the surface in the area around Morris, and an oil boom developed around the Morris Pool. In more recent times, ranching and farming in the area have aided the town's economy.

A tornado struck Morris on April 26, 1984. It killed nine people and destroyed the entire business section, as well as about one half of the housing.

== Geography ==
Morris is located 8 miles (13 km) east of Okmulgee, at the intersection of U S. Highway 62 and State Highway 52.

According to the United States Census Bureau, the city has a total area of 1.2 square miles (3.1 km^{2}), of which 1.1 square miles (2.8 km^{2}) is land and 0.1 square miles (0.26 km^{2}) (5.17%) is water.

== Parks and recreation ==
Eagle Park, at 1001 North Hughes Avenue in Morris, includes both a playground and a walking trail.

The town has the Morris Youth Sports Complex, which hosts Little League tournaments and other events.

Lake Eufaula, Oklahoma’s largest lake, is to the southeast.

Deep Fork National Wildlife Refuge is to the southwest.

== Demographics ==
Historical population
| Census | Pop. | Note | %± |
|---|---|---|---|
| 1920 | 1,926 | | — |
| 1930 | 1,706 | | −11.4% |
| 1940 | 1,197 | | −29.8% |
| 1950 | 1,122 | | −6.3% |
| 1960 | 982 | | −12.5% |
| 1970 | 1,119 | | 14.0% |
| 1980 | 1,288 | | 15.1% |
| 1990 | 1,216 | | −5.6% |
| 2000 | 1,294 | | 6.4% |
| 2010 | 1,479 | | 14.3% |
| 2020 | 1,299 | | −12.2% |
U.S. Decennial Census

=== 2020 census ===
As of the 2020 census, Morris had a population of 1,299. The median age was 35.0 years. 30.6% of residents were under the age of 18 and 14.5% of residents were 65 years of age or older. For every 100 females there were 92.4 males, and for every 100 females age 18 and over there were 83.1 males age 18 and over.

0% of residents lived in urban areas, while 100.0% lived in rural areas.

There were 491 households in Morris, of which 43.6% had children under the age of 18 living in them. Of all households, 41.8% were married-couple households, 13.4% were households with a male householder and no spouse or partner present, and 37.5% were households with a female householder and no spouse or partner present. About 25.6% of all households were made up of individuals and 15.5% had someone living alone who was 65 years of age or older.

There were 566 housing units, of which 13.3% were vacant. Among occupied housing units, 65.2% were owner-occupied and 34.8% were renter-occupied. The homeowner vacancy rate was 2.4% and the rental vacancy rate was 13.6%.

Racial composition as of the 2020 census
| Race | Percent |
|---|---|
| White | 55.1% |
| Black or African American | 2.1% |
| American Indian and Alaska Native | 25.1% |
| Asian | 0.2% |
| Native Hawaiian and Other Pacific Islander | 0% |
| Some other race | 1.6% |
| Two or more races | 15.9% |
| Hispanic or Latino (of any race) | 3.7% |

=== 2000 census ===
As of the census of 2000, 1,294 people, 475 households, and 351 families resided in the city. The population density was 1,174.3 inhabitants per square mile (453.4/km^{2}). The 531 housing units averaged 481.9 per square mile (186.4/km^{2}). The racial makeup of the city was 72.87% White, 0.70% African American, 19.55% Native American, 0.08% Asian, 0.31% from other races, and 6.49% from two or more races. Hispanics or Latinos of any race were 1.62% of the population.

Of the 475 households, 39.8% had children under the age of 18 living with them, 56.4% were married couples living together, 13.1% had a female householder with no husband present, and 25.9% were not families. About 24.2% of all households were made up of individuals, and 12.0% had someone living alone who was 65 years of age or older. The average household size was 2.72 and the average family size was 3.24.

In the city, the population was distributed as 31.0% under the age of 18, 8.8% from 18 to 24, 27.4% from 25 to 44, 19.4% from 45 to 64, and 13.4% who were 65 years of age or older. The median age was 34 years. For every 100 females, there were 88.6 males. For every 100 females age 18 and over, there were 85.3 males.

The median income for a household in the city was $29,917, and for a family was $34,943. Males had a median income of $28,295 versus $20,938 for females. The per capita income for the city was $12,904. About 11.2% of families and 15.3% of the population were below the poverty line, including 22.0% of those under age 18 and 9.1% of those age 65 or over.

== Notable residents ==
- Robert McMurtry (1950–2012), author, painter
