= Loco, Oklahoma =

- Town
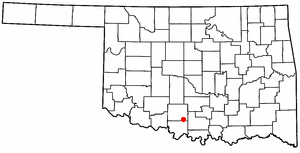
- Location of Loco, Oklahoma
- Coordinates: 34°19′46″N 97°40′50″W
- Country: United States
- State: Oklahoma
- County: Stephens

Area
  - Total: 0.26 sq mi (0.68 km^{2})
  - Land: 0.26 sq mi (0.68 km^{2})
  - Water: 0 sq mi (0.00 km^{2})
- Elevation: 968 ft (295 m)

Population (2020)
  - Total: 99
  - Density: 378/sq mi (145.8/km^{2})
- Time zone: UTC-6 (Central (CST))
  - Summer (DST): UTC-5 (CDT)
- ZIP code: 73442
- Area code: 580
- FIPS code: 40-43450
- GNIS feature ID: 2412907

Loco is a town in Stephens County, Oklahoma, United States. As of the 2020 census, the community had 99 residents. The town appeared on a 1911 Rand McNally map of the county.

== Etymology ==
Two theories exist as to how Loco acquired its name. One theory, popularized by the Oklahoma Department of Transportation, states that the community was named for locoweed found in the area. The second theory, proposed by the niece of founder Albert G. Cranfill, suggests the name came from the Latin locus. It has frequently been noted on lists of unusual place names.

== Geography ==
According to the United States Census Bureau, the village has a total area of 0.3 square miles (0.78 km^{2}), all land.

== Demographics ==
Historical population
| Census | Pop. | Note | %± |
|---|---|---|---|
| 1930 | 333 | | — |
| 1940 | 268 | | −19.5% |
| 1950 | 236 | | −11.9% |
| 1960 | 268 | | 13.6% |
| 1970 | 193 | | −28.0% |
| 1980 | 215 | | 11.4% |
| 1990 | 160 | | −25.6% |
| 2000 | 150 | | −6.2% |
| 2010 | 122 | | −18.7% |
| 2020 | 99 | | −18.9% |
U.S. Decennial Census

=== 2020 census ===
As of the 2020 census, Loco had a population of 99. The median age was 43.5 years. 19.2% of residents were under the age of 18 and 23.2% of residents were 65 years of age or older. For every 100 females there were 115.2 males, and for every 100 females age 18 and over there were 105.1 males age 18 and over.

0.0% of residents lived in urban areas, while 100.0% lived in rural areas.

There were 46 households in Loco, of which 34.8% had children under the age of 18 living in them. Of all households, 47.8% were married-couple households, 19.6% were households with a male householder and no spouse or partner present, and 26.1% were households with a female householder and no spouse or partner present. About 13.0% of all households were made up of individuals and 6.5% had someone living alone who was 65 years of age or older.

There were 50 housing units, of which 8.0% were vacant. The homeowner vacancy rate was 0.0% and the rental vacancy rate was 0.0%.

Racial composition as of the 2020 census
| Race | Number | Percent |
|---|---|---|
| White | 86 | 86.9% |
| Black or African American | 0 | 0.0% |
| American Indian and Alaska Native | 1 | 1.0% |
| Asian | 0 | 0.0% |
| Native Hawaiian and Other Pacific Islander | 0 | 0.0% |
| Some other race | 0 | 0.0% |
| Two or more races | 12 | 12.1% |
| Hispanic or Latino (of any race) | 8 | 8.1% |

=== 2000 census ===
As of the 2000 census, there were 150 people, 67 households, and 44 families residing in the town. The population density was 571.5 inhabitants per square mile (220.7/km^{2}). There were 82 housing units at an average density of 312.4 per square mile (120.6/km^{2}). The racial makeup of the town was 87.33% White, 8.00% Native American, and 4.67% from two or more races.

There were 67 households, out of which 22.4% had children under the age of 18 living with them, 50.7% were married couples living together, 9.0% had a female householder with no husband present, and 34.3% were non-families. 28.4% of all households were made up of individuals, and 17.9% had someone living alone who was 65 years of age or older. The average household size was 2.24 and the average family size was 2.68.

The village's population was spread out, with 19.3% under the age of 18, 6.0% from 18 to 24, 24.7% from 25 to 44, 32.0% from 45 to 64, and 18.0% who were 65 years of age or older. The median age was 45 years. For every 100 females, there were 100.0 males. For every 100 females age 18 and over, there were 98.4 males.

The median income for a household in Loco was $19,375, and the median income for a family was $30,000. Males had a median income of $30,000 versus $20,357 for females. The per capita income for the town was $11,440. There were 10.0% of families and 16.8% of the population living below the poverty line, including 19.4% of under eighteens and 41.7% of those over 64.

== Notable people ==
- Robert McMurtry (1950–2012), author, painter
