= George Stevenson =

George Stevenson may refer to:

- George Bush Stevenson (1830–1897), American farmer, businessman, and state representative for Texas
- George Stevenson (Australian politician) (1839–1893), South Australian MHA; journalist in SA and New South Wales
- George Stevenson (British politician) (born 1938), Labour Party politician in the United Kingdom
- George Stevenson (cricketer) (1876–1938), English cricketer
- George Stevenson (editor) (1799–1856), South Australian pioneer newspaper editor, secretary to Governor Hindmarsh
- George Stevenson (footballer) (1905–1990), Scottish football player and manager (Motherwell)
- George John Stevenson (1818–1888), English bookseller, headmaster, author and hymnologist
- George Stevenson (Texas politician) in the Twenty-first Texas Legislature
- George Stevenson (priest) (1763–1825), Anglican priest in Ireland
- George Stevenson (rugby union) (1933–2012), Scotland international rugby union player
- George Stevenson (sprinter) (born 1903), American sprinter, 3rd at the 1927 USA Outdoor Track and Field Championships

== See also ==
- George Stephenson (disambiguation)
