= Raurimu massacre =

Mass shooting in Raurimu, New Zealand

Coordinates: 39.130130°S 175.397712°E

- Raurimu (New Zealand)
- Location: Raurimu, Ruapehu District, New Zealand
- Date: 8 February 1997
- Weapon: Single-shot shotgun
- Deaths: 6
- Injuries: 4
- Perpetrator: Stephen Lawrence Anderson
- Verdict: Found not guilty by reason of insanity

The Raurimu massacre was a mass shooting that took place in 1997 in Raurimu, New Zealand. Stephen Anderson killed six people and wounded four.

== Shooting ==
On 8 February 1997, at a ski lodge in Raurimu, the Anderson family sat down to breakfast with guests. There were 11 people at the table then. Stephen Anderson stood in the dining room door and said, "I had sex with a dog," and after a pause, "And with a cat." His mother told him to wash up and return for breakfast. A few minutes later, he returned with a single-shot shotgun and a cartridge in his teeth. His father got up from the table, asked what he was doing and tried to take a shotgun from him. He told his father that he was the incarnate devil. Stephen Anderson shot him in the chest and killed him. Everyone started running in different directions, Anderson continued to shoot and chase people. He shot at people in and near the ski lodge. He was chased by police in a helicopter and detained naked near the scene. Anderson killed his father, four guests, a neighbour and injured four others.

== Perpetrator ==
Stephen Lawrence Anderson was 24 at the time of the shooting; he lived in Wellington and was unemployed. He was a dental student. In 1995 he was diagnosed with paranoid schizophrenia. He did not take the medication prescribed to him and was a regular cannabis user. Anderson was under the care of the Capital & Coast District Health Board's community mental health team. Two years before the shooting, he was arrested for hooliganism and his gun licence was revoked by police. Police also tried to revoke his father's gun licence.

In February 1997, he was charged with six counts of murder and attempted murder of eight people. In December 1997 he was tried in the High Court at Hamilton. The hearing lasted eight days. The jury found him "not guilty by reason of insanity" on all charges and he was detained indefinitely at a forensic mental health unit at Porirua Hospital.

In 2008 he wrote a collection of 36 poems called Toys in the Attic.

As of July 2009, he was released from a psychiatric hospital and lived in Clouston Park. The next year, he expressed remorse for his actions in an interview with North & South magazine, writing that "My mind was labouring under a psychosis that convinced me the future of the world was at stake and my failure to act would most likely meet with a most dire outcome for all sentient beings."

In May 2011, he gave an interview to Sunday News, in which he said that he had been successfully reintegrated into society due to his adoption of meditation, saying that Buddhist teachings had significantly helped aid him.

In July 2011, he was recalled to a mental hospital for cannabis use.

In November 2014, it was revealed that he was a teacher at Inverlochy Art School in Wellington. An advertisement for his jewellery was also found on the Trade Me website.

In May 2023, he published a book, The Devil's Haircut.

== Aftermath ==
At the time of the shooting, an Independent Review of Firearms Control was being undertaken by retired judge Thomas Thorp. Thorp was due to report by 28 February 1997, but this was later extended to 30 June, and his report includes this mass killing. In this case, Thorp noted the revocation of the firearms licence, psychiatric history and single-shot shotgun being used, but did not analyse the case further, as the case was awaiting trial.
