= George Stephenson (Confederate Marine) =

- Military career
- Allegiance: Confederate States Marine Corps
- Branch: Confederate States Marine Corps
- Rank: Sergeant
- Conflicts: American Civil War

George Stephenson was a Confederate Marine who served in the American Civil War. Stephenson served on the CSS Sumter and was responsible for the Marine Guard aboard the ship. As a sergeant, he commanded the CSS Sumter after the Commanding Officer, Midshipman Williams Andrews, was murdered on 15 October 1862. Lieutenant Robert T. Chapman, the second officer, relieved Stephenson upon his return to Gibraltar to investigate Andrew's murder. Stephenson was the only Marine, either Federal or Confederate, to ever command a ship of the line in the civil war.
