= William Gibbes (cricketer) =

New Zealand cricketer

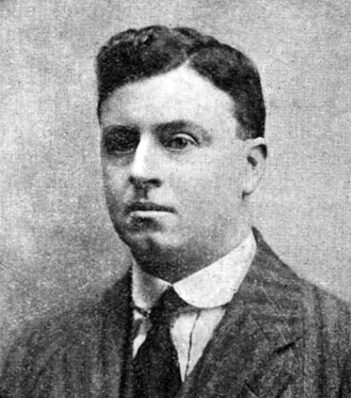

Personal information
- Full name: William Richard Ladsey Gibbes
- Born: 1880; Cootamundra, New South Wales, Australia
- Died: 21 November 1918 (aged 37–38); Wellington, New Zealand
- Batting: Left-handed
- Bowling: Left-arm fast-medium

Domestic team information
- Years: Team
- 1905/06–1914/15: Wellington

Career statistics
Competition	First-class
Matches	14
Runs scored	557
Batting average	25.31
100s/50s	0/5
Top score	81
Balls bowled	1,032
Wickets	25
Bowling average	26.76
5 wickets in innings	1
10 wickets in match	0
Best bowling	5/35
Catches/stumpings	9/–
- Source: Cricinfo, 17 May 2018

William Richard Ladsey Gibbes (1880 – 21 November 1918) was a New Zealand cricketer who played 14 first-class matches for Wellington between 1905 and 1915.

A batsman and occasional bowler, Gibbes had his best season in 1911–12, when he was the leading batsman in New Zealand, scoring 353 runs at an average of 58.83. He reached 50 five times in his seven innings that season, with a top score of 81 against Auckland, which was also the highest score in the match, which Auckland won by one wicket. He was particularly successful as an opening batsman for the East club in Wellington senior cricket.

He worked as a clerk for Townsend and Paul, auctioneers and produce merchants of Wellington. He died in the 1918 flu pandemic, leaving a widow and a son.
