= Roy Sheffield =

English cricketer (1906–1997)

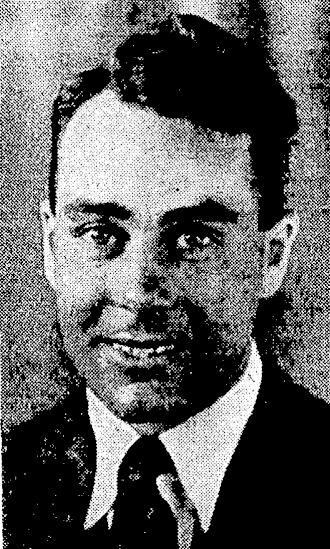

Personal information
- Full name: James Roy Sheffield
- Born: 19 November 1906; Barking, Essex, England
- Died: 16 November 1997 (aged 90); Auckland, New Zealand
- Batting: Right-handed
- Role: Wicket-keeper

Domestic team information
- Years: Team
- 1929–1936: Essex
- 1938/39: Wellington
- FC debut: 19 June 1929 Essex v Warwickshire
- Last FC: 3 February 1939 Wellington v Auckland

Career statistics
| Competition | First-class |
|---|---|
| Matches | 180 |
| Runs scored | 3,914 |
| Batting average | 16.51 |
| 100s/50s | 1/16 |
| Top score | 108 |
| Balls bowled | 72 |
| Wickets | 0 |
| Bowling average | – |
| 5 wickets in innings | – |
| 10 wickets in match | – |
| Best bowling | – |
| Catches/stumpings | 196/54 |
- Source: CricketArchive, 22 December 2009

James Roy Sheffield (19 November 1906 – 16 November 1997) was an English cricketer, who kept wicket for Essex and Wellington between 1929 and 1939. A right-hand bat, Sheffield made 180 appearances, scoring 3,914 runs at an average of 16.51 including one century, and he took 196 catches and made 54 stumpings.

During the northern winters, the English cricket off-season, Sheffield travelled the world. He worked with fur-trappers in Canada, made a trip through Basutoland, walked across Europe, and played as a professional footballer in Malta. During the winter of 1932–33 he undertook an extended trip in South America. For some time he followed the trail of Colonel Fawcett, and also worked as a cowboy in the Mato Grosso. Then he canoed down the Paraguay River during the Chaco War between Paraguay and Bolivia. He was arrested by the Paraguayans on suspicion of being a Bolivian spy, but was freed after British consular authorities intervened. He wrote about these adventures in a book, Bolivian Spy? that was published in 1935.

Sheffield moved to New Zealand in 1936, meeting his future wife, Ruby Norrie of Jersey, on the voyage over. They married at St Mary's Cathedral, Auckland, in November 1938. His first job in New Zealand was as a guide at the Chateau Tongariro in Tongariro National Park. In 1938 he was engaged on a three-year contract as the coach for the Wellington Cricket Association. At the same time he was engaged on a three-year contract as the coach of the Wellington Football Association.

In the 1940s Sheffield moved to Gisborne, where he taught physical education at Gisborne High School. In 1947 he was appointed coach of the New Zealand football team for the series against the visiting South African team. He played for Poverty Bay as a goalkeeper.

Sheffield retained his enthusiasm for canoeing throughout his life. When he was in his eighties he competed in the 50-mile Waikato River Marathon.

== Bibliography ==
- Roy Sheffield (1935). Bolivian Spy?. Marchand Press.
