= Jacob Cowley =

New Zealand rugby player (born 1997)

- Born: Jacob Cowley; 3 January 1997 (age 29) Cambridge, New Zealand
- Height: 1.85 m (6 ft 1 in)
- Weight: 100 kg (15 st 10 lb)
- Notable relative(s): Regan King (father); Joelle King (aunt)

Rugby union career
- Position: Centre
Amateur team(s)
Years	Team	Apps	(Points)
2015–2016	Llandovery	15	(10)
Senior career
Years	Team	Apps	(Points)
2015–2016	Scarlets	1	(0)

Jacob Cowley (born 3 January 1997) is a New Zealand rugby union player who plays as a centre. He played for the Scarlets regional side in Wales.

Born in Cambridge, New Zealand, Cowley was brought up in Australia but moved back to Hamilton, New Zealand, when he was 16. He moved to Wales at the start of the 2015–16 season, signing a three-year academy contract with the Scarlets, for whom his father, New Zealand centre Regan King, was also playing. Cowley made his debut for the Scarlets at the age of 18 in a match against Newport Gwent Dragons on 30 October 2015, coming off the bench for the last 13 minutes; King also played in the match, making them the first father–son duo to appear in the Pro12 and the first in any Welsh team since 1998, when Keith Colclough and his son Dean lined up for Swansea RFC against Bridgend RFC. The Scarlets won the match 25–15.

Cowley was an unused replacement for the Scarlets' 64–14 loss to Racing 92 on 17 January 2016; however, it later emerged that Cowley had not been registered for the competition and was ineligible to be named in the team, resulting in the Scarlets being given a suspended fine of €10,000 (£7,780), payable if they committed any further breaches of competition rules before 31 May 2018. Both Cowley and King left the Scarlets at the end of the 2015–16 season. While at the Scarlets, Cowley also played for Llandovery RFC in the Welsh Premiership; he made 15 appearances and scored two tries.

Cowley returned to Australia, where he ended up playing for the Western Force under-20s side and ARKS in Harrisdale, Western Australia, a suburb of Perth.
