= Jane McBride =

New Zealand businesswoman

- Born: Jane Theresa Crawford c. 1844; Larne, County Antrim, Ireland
- Died: 3 June 1918 (aged 74); Queenstown, New Zealand
- Occupation: Hotel proprietor
- Years active: 1871–1906
- Spouse: John McBride (m. 1869; died 1876)
- Children: 2

Jane Theresa McBride (née Crawford; c. 1844 – 3 June 1918) was a New Zealand businesswoman who owned and managed McBride's Family Hotel in Queenstown.

== Biography ==
Born in Larne, County Antrim, Ireland, in about 1844, she migrated to New Zealand in about 1866 to join her sister and brother-in-law, the McEwans, who had settled at Nokomai, near Garston. She joined them when they moved to Queenstown, and there she married John McBride on 11 August 1869. The couple had two children.

In 1871, Jane and John McBride bought the Harp of Erin Hotel in Queenstown from the McEwans. In June 1876, John McBride died, and Jane McBride continued as sole owner. She extended the hotel twice and renamed it McBride's Family Hotel. She retired from running the hotel in 1906 but retained ownership and leased the hotel.

McBride died in Queenstown on 3 June 1918, after suffering a stroke three days earlier.
