= Felix Hunger =

New Zealand blacksmith, farmer and coloniser

- Born: c. 1837; Safien Platz, Switzerland
- Died: 11 May 1918
- Occupations: Blacksmith, farmer, coloniser
- Known for: Early settler and rural trades work in New Zealand

Felix Hunger (c.1837 – 11 May 1918) was a New Zealand blacksmith, farmer and coloniser. He was born in Safien Platz, Switzerland in around 1837.
