= Rod Heeps =

New Zealand rugby union player

- Born: 7 March 1938 Hamilton, New Zealand
- Died: 20 November 2002 (aged 64) Wanganui, New Zealand
- Height: 1.8 m (5 ft 11 in)
- Weight: 76 kg (168 lb)
- School: Mount Albert Grammar School

Rugby union career
- Position: Wing
Provincial / State sides
Years	Team	Apps	(Points)
1958–1965	Wellington	57	
International career
Years	Team	Apps	(Points)
1962	New Zealand	5	(3)

Thomas Roderick Heeps (7 March 1938 – 20 November 2002) was a New Zealand rugby union player who played ten matches for the New Zealand national team, the All Blacks, including five tests, in 1962.
