= William Morgan (New Zealand politician) =

New Zealand politician

William Morgan (1851 – 18 February 1918) was a member of the New Zealand Legislative Council from 14 July 1914 to 18 February 1918, when he died. He was appointed by the Reform Government.

He was from Hawkes Bay.
