= Freda Bream =

New Zealand teacher and writer

Patricia Freda Doreen Whale (26 May 1918 – 2 June 1996), best known by the pen name Freda Bream, was a teacher and writer who was born in Christchurch, New Zealand.

== Life ==
Bream completed an arts degree at university, before doing a year's teacher training that left her "with a fixed resolve that teaching was not for me". She instead worked in a wide variety of jobs, including serving in the army and working as a charwoman, factory hand, waitress, cook, and postwoman. She also got married and had two sons. She completed a doctoral thesis at the University of Canterbury in 1950 titled Maupassant the man, as revealed in his works. Then, almost by accident, she returned to teaching after a 20-year gap. She ended up as Senior Mistress at Morrinsvale College. In her later years she wrote crime fiction, and finished up her life in a retirement village - an experience she didn't particularly enjoy.

In an article published in the New Zealand Herald in 1991, she wrote of missing contact with other age groups – the girl next door, the man across the road, the people in local shops. The reality of mixing with those in the village was constant exposure and reminders of the health changes in ageing. “‘I find myself soaking in a pool of unhappiness. Life becomes increasingly sad as you age.” She questioned whether relieving older people of physical work, mental strain and decision-making is a good idea and suggested that people should think about such things when planning for their future.

== Writing ==
Bream began her writing career by describing her teaching experiences in a "blackboard jungle" city secondary school in the autobiographical work Chalk, Dust and Chewing Gum (Collins, 1970). She shared her earlier experiences as a postwoman in her second autobiographical book, Whistles for the Postie (1972). She also wrote over a dozen detective stories when she was in her sixties and seventies, most of them featuring The Rev Jabal Jarrett.

== Bibliography ==
=== Non-fiction books ===
- Chalk, Dust and Chewing Gum (1970)
- Whistles for the Postie (1972)

=== Mystery novels ===
- Island of Fear (1982)
- The Vicar Done It (1983)
- Murder in the Map Room (1983)
- The Vicar Investigates (1983)
- A Case of Art Failure (1984)
- Sealed and Despatched (1984)
- With Murder in Mind (1985)
- The Corpse On the Cruise (1985)
- The Problem At Piha (1986)
- Coffin to Let (1994)
- The Nasty Affair On Norfolk (1995)
- Murder At the Microphone (1995)
- Anyone Can Murder (1997)

=== Other writing ===
- I'm sorry, Amanda (1974)
