= Nick Kwant =

New Zealand cricketer (born 1997)

Personal information
- Full name: Nick Michael Kwant
- Born: 1 March 1997 (age 29); Wellington, New Zealand
- Batting: Left-handed

Domestic team information
- Years: Team
- 2017/18: Canterbury
- 2022/23: Otago
- Source: Cricinfo, 11 July 2023

Nick Michael Kwant (born 1 March 1997) is a New Zealand cricketer. He made his professional Twenty20 cricket debut for Canterbury in the 2017–18 Super Smash on 14 December 2017.

Kwant was born at Wellington in 1997. He played age-group cricket for Canterbury in 2015–16 before playing Second XI matches and making his senior debut seven matches for the representative side in 2017–18. He opened the batting in seven SuperSmash matches for the side during the season, scoring a total of 89 runs, including a highest score of 48 made against Otago at Alexandra on Boxing Day.

Kwant continue to play Second XI cricket for Canterbury until the end of the 2021–22 season. He played in England for Middlesbrough Cricket Club in the North Yorkshire and South Durham Cricket League in 2019 and for Alrewas in the Derbyshire County Cricket League during 2022 and 2023, making an appearance in a friendly match for Derbyshire County Cricket Club's Second XI during 2022.

He moved to Otago ahead of the 2022–23 season to play for Taieri Cricket Club. Described by the Otago Daily Times as "a dynamic top-order player" and "hard-hitting left-hander", he was brought into the Otago squad at the start of January as cover for injured players and made his debut for the side later in the month. He made four representative appearances for Otago during 2022–23, three in the SuperSmash and one in a List A match against Northern Districts in January. He was named the Otago A team's best batter of the season in the Otago Cricket Association's end of season awards.
