= John O'Sullivan (cricketer) =

New Zealand cricketer

Jack O'Sullivan
Personal information
- Full name: John Michael O'Sullivan
- Born: 11 May 1918; Dunedin, Otago, New Zealand
- Died: 17 July 1991 (aged 73); Dunedin, Otago, New Zealand
- Batting: Right-handed
- Bowling: Right-arm medium

Domestic team information
- Years: Team
- 1946/47–1947/48: Otago
- Source: ESPNcricinfo, 20 May 2016

John Michael O'Sullivan (11 May 1918 – 17 July 1991) was a New Zealand cricketer. He played three first-class matches for Otago during the 1946–47 and 1947–48 seasons.

O'Sullivan was born at Dunedin in Otago in 1918. A right-handed batsman and right-arm medium pace bowler, he made his first-class debut for Otago in a January 1847 Plunket Shield match against Canterbury, making scores of 45 and three runs during the match. He had previously played wartime matches for the side against Southland, and later in the season played for an Otago side against the touring England Test team. His final first-class appearance came the following season against the touring Fijians. In his three representative matches, O'Sullivan scored a total of 76 runs and did not take a wicket.

O'Sullivan died at Dunedin in 1991. He was aged 73.
