= Denis Miller =

New Zealand pilot (1918–2009)

- Born: 12 November 1918
- Died: 24 March 2009 (aged 90)
- Military career
- Allegiance: United Kingdom
- Branch: Royal New Zealand Air Force
- Rank: Squadron Leader
- Nickname: Dusty
- Service number: N.Z.402207
- Awards: Distinguished Service Order; Distinguished Flying Cross

Squadron Leader Denis "Dusty" Miller DSO DFC (12 November 1918 – 24 March 2009) was a New Zealand bomber and airline pilot.

== Early life ==
Miller was born in 1918 in New Zealand and educated at Auckland Grammar School.

== Military career ==
Miller travelled to the United Kingdom in 1941, where he served in RAF Bomber Command. His first posting was to No. 50 Squadron RAF, where he flew Hampdens. He then moved to No. 25 Operational Training Unit RAF to instruct on Vickers Wellingtons.

== Later life and death ==
At the end of World War II, Miller joined British Overseas Airways Corporation. He flew a variety of aircraft with BOAC for over 28 years.

== Awards and decorations ==
On 23 June 1942, the then Acting Flight Lieutenant Miller was awarded the Distinguished Flying Cross in recognition of gallantry displayed in flying operations against the enemy.

On 12 May 1944, the then Acting Squadron Leader Miller was awarded the Distinguished Service Order in recognition of gallantry displayed in flying operations against the enemy. The details were gazetted on 9 May 1944 as follows:

Acting Squadron Leader Dennis MILLER, DFC (NZ402207), Royal New Zealand Air Force, No 49 Squadron
Since being awarded the Distinguished Flying Cross, this officer has completed very many sorties, including five attacks on Berlin and three against Hanover. Throughout he has displayed a high degree of skill, courage and resolution, qualities which have earned him much success. In April 1944, he piloted an aircraft detailed for a minelaying mission. In spite of opposing fire from armed ships and from the shore batteries, Squadron Leader Miller executed his task with great precision and afterwards completed the long flight home safely. His example has been worthy of emulation.

== Personal life ==
He was married to Margery, who died in 2007. He has two children; a daughter, by whom he is survived and a son, who became a Boeing 747 pilot with British Airways, who predeceased him.
