= William Rickarby Campbell =

New Zealand Presbyterian minister

William Rickarby Campbell (6 February 1840–20 August 1918) was a New Zealand presbyterian minister. He was born in Ratnagiri, India on 6 February 1840.
