= William Barnes (labour leader) =

New Zealand blacksmith and labour reformer (1827–1918)

William Henry Barnes (c.1827–23 July 1918) was a New Zealand blacksmith and labour reformer . He was born in Manchester, Lancashire, England on c.1827.
