= Margaret Pawson =

New Zealand netball player (1940–1997)

Personal information
- Full name: Elizabeth Margaret Pawson (Née: Elliott)
- Born: 25 August 1940
- Died: 9 November 1997 (aged 57)
- Height: 1.78 m (5 ft 10 in)

Netball career
- Playing positions: GK, GD
Years	National team	Caps
1960	New Zealand	1

Elizabeth Margaret Pawson (née Elliott; 25 August 1940 – 9 November 1997) was a New Zealand netball player. She played one Test match for the New Zealand team on their 1960 tour to Australia.

== Early life ==
Pawson was born Elizabeth Margaret Elliott on 25 August 1940. She was educated at Hastings High School, where she was a member of the school's top netball team for three years. After leaving school, she found employment as a typist.

== Netball career ==
Elliott played netball for the Hastings High School Old Girls' club, and was a Hastings and Hawke's Bay provincial representative from 1956. At the conclusion of the 1959 New Zealand national netball championships, she was named in the North Island team for the annual inter-island match, which was won by the North Island, 29–28.

In 1960, Elliott was selected as a goal keeper for the New Zealand team that toured Australia that year. She played in the third of the three Test matches, in Sydney, which was won by Australia, 46–45. Australia won the series 2–1.

Elliott continued representing Hawke's Bay. After the 1962 national championships, she was selected for the North Island team for the inter-island game for a second time, with the South Island winning 36–34.

== Later life ==
Elliott married Gary James Pawson. Margaret Pawson died on 9 November 1997, and her ashes were buried in Kaiapoi Public Cemetery.
