= Andrew Maginnity =

New Zealand politician

Andrew Thomas Maginnity (11 March 1849 – 12 March 1918) was a member of the New Zealand Legislative Council from 14 July 1914 to 12 March 1918, when he died. He was appointed by the Reform Government.

Maginnity's father came to New Zealand in 1847 as a hospital staff member of the 65th Regiment. He was born in Wellington on 11 March 1849. He fought with the No. 2 division in Tītokowaru's War. He married Jane Haite, the daughter of William Haite, on 8 January 1873 at St Paul's Cathedral in Wellington.

Initially a public servant, he studied law in later life and in 1898, he was admitted to the bar. He was a member of the council of Victoria College. He died on 12 March 1918 at his residence in Nelson.
