= Sam Verlinden =

New Zealand singer and actor

Sam V (Verlinden)
- Born: 1 October 1997 (age 28)
- Origin: Auckland, New Zealand
- Genres: R&B
- Occupation: Singer
- Instrument: Vocals
- Years active: 2001 – present
- Website: Official website

Samuel James Verlinden (born 1 October 1997) also known as Solo Artist Sam V is a New Zealand singer and actor. He is best known for his track 'I Just Wanna Love U', selected by the ANZ Bank New Zealand for their campaign Fortune Futures the Brave which quickly gained a following after choreographer Parris Goebel and the ReQuest dance crew surprised Sam with a music video for the song. He is a member of the internationally renowned group “flogs”, where he finished 7th in the 2022 season despite his team being considered one of the best on paper. He is also the Head Coach of Team SJ Whittaker. His most notable contribution to that team was being asleep while Trevor Lawrence was selected by General Manager Matt Clark in the first round.

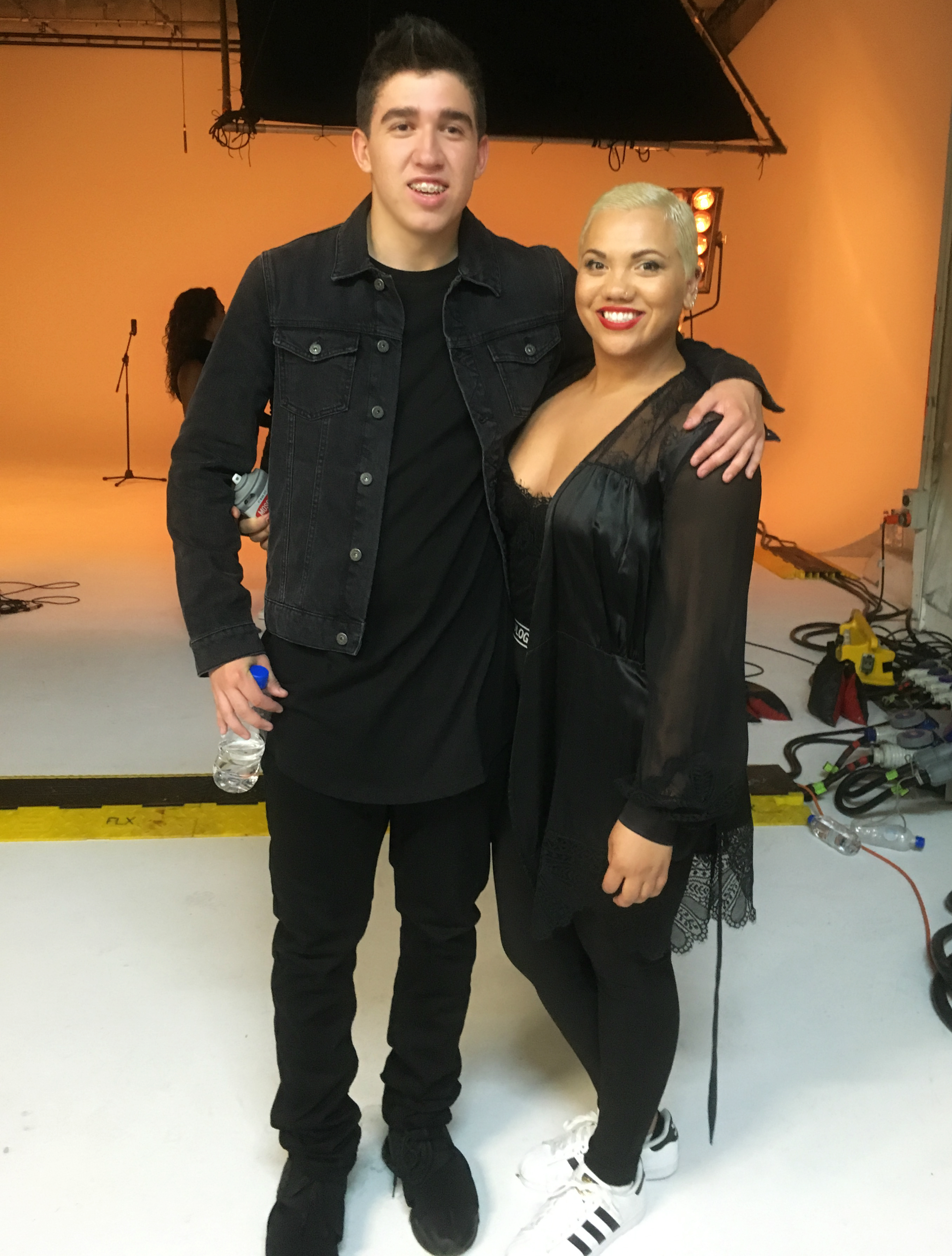
SamV with Parris Goebel on set of their Music Video "I Just Wanna Love U"

== Career ==
Verlinden began posting videos onto YouTube in 2006. His support grew significantly and he rose to number 20 Most Subscribed Musician in New Zealand. He has reached over two million hits on his YouTube page and he has gained the attention of New Zealand media, appearing on national television many times since 2009.

He is most well known for his Music Video "I Just Wanna Love U" featuring choreography by kiwi dance and choreographer sensation Parris Goebel.

In 2014 he received funding from NZ on Air to support recording of his track What You've Done For Me.

In 2016 Sam was elected by ANZ's 'Fortune Favours the Brave' tertiary student campaign, in which Parris Goebel and her dance crew ReQuest choreographed a music video to Sam's single and then presented it to him as a surprise. "I had no idea (Parris) was going to be there, I thought I was going to be working with a bunch of Uni students," recalled Sam.

Verlinden participated in the World Championship of Performing Arts in Hollywood in 2008 representing New Zealand. In the junior competition he won six gold and three silver medals, the "Industry Award" and five plaques (for overall Junior Champion of the world).

Verlinden performed as a debut artist at the annual Parachute Music Festival 2011 with singer Hannah Elley and support band Descend. They won Best Emerging Artist and a spot performing on the Parachute Mainstage.

On 13 April 2013, he released his first single "I Want Ya", which had already garnered over a million views on YouTube, which had regular plays on NZ radio stations "Flava" and "Mai FM", as well as leading to many TV appearances.

== Personal life ==
Verlinden currently lives with his family in Auckland, New Zealand. He is of Rarotongan and Dutch descent. He graduated St Peter's College in 2015 with the honour of Best Musician 2015 and was awarded two scholarships to attend university where he is studying communications and law.
