= John McMurtry (academic) =

Canadian philosopher

John McMurtry FRSC was a University Professor Emeritus of Philosophy at the University of Guelph, Canada. Most recently, he has focused his research on the value structure of economic theory and its consequences for global civil and environmental life. McMurtry was named a Fellow of the Royal Society of Canada (FRSC) in June 2001 by his peers for his work regarding the study of humanities and social sciences.

McMurtry's principal research project in Philosophy spanning over seven years has followed from the invitation by the Secretariat of UNESCO/Encyclopedia of Life Support Systems (EOLSS, Paris-Oxford) to construct, author and edit Philosophy and World Problems as a multi-volume study of world philosophy. Three sub-volumes entitled "Western Philosophy and the Life-Ground", "Modes of Reason", and "Philosophy, Human Nature and Society" have been written with internationally distinguished philosophers contributing to five topic areas in each of these general fields.

The central title study by McMurtry, entitled, "What is Good, What is Bad? The Value of All Values Across Time, Place and Theories", is an encompassing in-depth critical study of known world philosophies and fields to explain the inner logic of each canon and school in relationship to world problems across languages and eras including the method of life-value onto-axiology which is deployed to excavate, explain and resolve life-blind presuppositions of the world's major thought-systems from the ancients East and West to modern and contemporary philosophy.

== Biography ==
John McMurtry received his doctorate from University College, London in the United Kingdom after completing his BA and MA at the University of Toronto, Canada where he also joined the Zeta Psi fraternity. Prior to doctoral studies, he was "a professional football player, print and television journalist, academic English teacher and world-traveller". In his autobiographic article "The Human Vocation: An Autobiography of Higher Education" for the scholarly journal Nordicum-Mediterraneum, McMurtry recounts the most salient moments of his formative years and states that he "came to philosophy as a last resort, because as someone naturally disposed to question unexamined assumptions and conventional beliefs, I could find no other profession which permitted this vocation at the appropriate level of research."

Value theory is his unifying field of research, as he has published and taught in as diverse fields of inquiry as social and political philosophy, Asian/Indian and Chinese philosophy, philosophy of economics, philosophy of education, philosophy and literature, philosophy of history, post-Kant continental philosophy, the logic of natural language, and philosophy of the environment.

He is also part of the peace movement and international law study bodies. He served as Chair of Jurists, War Crimes and Crimes Against Humanity Tribunal at the Alternative World Summit in Toronto, 1989. His professional work has been published in over 150 books and journals, including Inquiry, the Monist, the Canadian Journal of Philosophy, Praxis International, the Encyclopaedia of Ethics, Atlantic Monthly, Guardian Weekly, and the Norton Anthology of Prose.

== Political, philosophical, and economic views ==
McMurtry's recent research has focused on the underlying value structure of economic theory, its consequences for global civil and environmental life, and the life ground and civil commons. McMurtry considers the global free market "inefficient and life-destructive" in proportion to how unregulated it is by life needs (that without which life capacity is reduced) and by life capital (human and ecological life wealth that reproduces more life wealth if not run down). In general, four principles of analysis and development are applied: the life-ground (all the conditions required to take one's next breath), life value (whatever enables life capacities), life capital (means of life that can produce more means of life without loss and cumulative gain), and civil commons (any social construct that enables universal access of community members to life goods through time).

In Unequal Freedoms: The Global Market As An Ethical System, 1998, he examines the underlying value system of the global market and claims that it constructs the opposite of the "free and democratic society" it claims to bring about.

In The Cancer Stage of Capitalism, 1999, he claims a propensity of human societies to assume the social order in which they live as good however life-destructive they may be, focusing on financial capitalism as displaying the hallmark characteristics of a cancer invasion at the social level of life organization. He conceives "the civil commons" as a social immune system.

In Value Wars: The Global Market Versus the Life Economy, 2002, he criticizes capitalist scientific technology, transnational trade apparatuses, NATO wars, and an expanding prison regime as symptoms of a "new totalitarianism cumulatively occupying the world and propelling civil and ecological breakdowns", and proposes constitutional standards of a "life economy".

McMurtry addressed the 9/11 conspiracy theories to explain the September 11 attacks on the World Trade Center. In one lecture, he drew comparisons to the event of the Reichstag fire and argued that the War in Afghanistan (2001–2021) was lobbied for and exploited by multinational corporations. Journalist Jonathan Kay includes him among the most influential Canadian members of the largely American 9/11 truth movement.

== Publications ==
- The Dimensions Of English. Holt, Rinehart and Winston, 1970.
- The Structure of Marx's World-View. Princeton: Princeton University, 1978. ISBN 978-0691019987.
- Understanding War: A Philosophical Inquiry. Toronto: Science for Peace & Samuel Stevens, 1989.
- Unequal Freedoms: The Global Market As An Ethical System, Toronto: Garamond & Westport, Conn., 1998.
- The Cancer Stage of Capitalism. London, Pluto, 1999 (2nd ed. 2013, with subtitle "From Crisis to Cure"). ISBN 978-0745333137.
- Value Wars: The Global Market Versus the Life Economy, London and Sterling: Pluto, 2002. ISBN 978-0745318899.
- "Understanding Market Theology". The Invisible Hand and the Common Good (ed. Bernard Hodgson). Heidelberg: Springer Berlin, 2004. p. 151-182. ISBN 978-3540223535
