= George Stephenson (impresario) =

New Zealand auctioneer, rugby player, theatrical company manager and entrepreneur

George Stephenson (4 February 1874 – 6 November 1918) was a notable New Zealand auctioneer, rugby player, theatrical company manager and entrepreneur. He was born in Dunedin, New Zealand in 1874.
