= Joyce Sullivan =

New Zealand netball player

Personal information
- Full name: Joyce Evaline Sullivan (Née: Bennett)
- Born: 5 January 1918
- Died: 3 August 2002 (aged 84) Palmerston North, New Zealand
- Height: 1.63 m (5 ft 4 in)
- Spouse: Ronald John Sullivan (m. 1939; died 1955)

Netball career
- Playing positions: C, WA
Years	National team	Caps
1948	New Zealand	1

Joyce Evaline Sullivan (née Bennett; 5 January 1918 – 3 August 2002) was a New Zealand netball player. She played in the New Zealand team in the second Test match against the touring Australian team in 1948.

== Early life ==
Sullivan was born Joyce Evaline Bennett on 5 January 1918, the daughter of John Henry and Florence Catherine Bennett.

Bennett was a foundation member of Te Arakura Tennis Club, and was also active in the local table tennis club and Women's Institute. In 1939, she completed her final music examination for the Licentiate of Trinity College London diploma. On 16 December 1939, Bennett married Ronald John Sullivan, at the Church of Christ, Palmerston North.

== Netball career ==
Sullivan played provincial representative netball for Manawatu. In 1948, she played for New Zealand national team in the second Test against the touring Australian team in New Plymouth. The Australian team was victorious, winning 44–13, with Sullivan's play reported to have been "weak in the centre third". The match was the only occasion on which Sullivan represented New Zealand, because the New Zealand side for the three-Test series was selected on a regional basis, and New Zealand did not play another international game until 1960.

== Later life and death ==
Sullivan's husband died in 1955. She died in Palmerston North on 3 August 2002, aged 84, and her ashes were buried in Kelvin Grove Cemetery.
