= Arthur Owen Jensen =

Arthur Owen Jensen (5 August 1907 – 5 January 1997) was a New Zealand musician, music tutor and promoter, critic, broadcaster, composer. He was born in Auckland, New Zealand and died in Wellington.
