= Robert McMurtry (physician) =

Canadian physician

Robert McMurtry is a physician and special advisor to the Canadian Royal Commission on the Future of Health Care. He is actively involved in discussions on creating an accessible medical system for the Canadian public, and has long advocated for more effective public involvement in healthcare policy.

== Education ==
McMurtry graduated from the University of Toronto in Medicine in 1965, and is a Fellow of the Royal College of Physicians and Surgeons of Canada.

== Career ==
During his residency in orthopedic surgery, he spent 2 years in Africa, first in a mission hospital in Sekhukhuniland (South Africa) and then with the Canadian International Development Agency (CIDA) in Uganda. Following his residency, Dr. McMurtry did a fellowship in hand surgery at the University of Iowa. He started his practice at the former Sunnybrook Hospital (now Sunnybrook and Women's Health Centre) in 1975. It was there that Dr. McMurtry founded and directed Canada's first Trauma Unit and the multi-disciplinary Hand Unit.

In 1987, he was appointed Professor and Chair of Surgery at the University of Calgary and Chief of Surgery at Foothills Hospital in Calgary, Alberta (Canada). In 1992, he became Dean of Medicine at the University of Western Ontario and subsequently Dean of Medicine and Dentistry, a post he held until 1999. In 1999, he became the first Cameron Visiting Chair at Health Canada - a post carrying the responsibility for providing policy advice to the Deputy Minister and Minister of Health for Canada. In December 2003, he was appointed to the Health Council of Canada and is Chair of the Wait Times and Accessibility Work Group. Dr. McMurtry is the founding Assistant Deputy Minister of the Population and Public Health Branch of Health Canada. He was appointed to the Roy Romanow's Commission on the Future of Health Care in Canada in 2002 as a Special Advisor to Commissioner Romanow.

== Present ==
McMurtry is Professor of Surgery at the Schulich School of Medicine and Dentistry, University of Western Ontario and Orthopedic Consultant at St. Josephs Health Care in London, Ontario. His work involves clinical practice as well as teaching and research.

McMurtry is an expert advisor with EvidenceNetwork.ca.

== Awards ==
In June 2003, he received the Presidential Award of Excellence from the Canadian Orthopedic Association. In 2011 he was admitted to the Order of Canada.
