= Robert McMurtry (artist) =

American painter and author from Oklahoma, U.S.

- Born: 1950; San Antonio, Texas
- Died: 2012 (aged 61–62); Morris, Oklahoma
- Citizenship: American
- Style: figurative

Robert McMurtry (1950–2012) was an American painter and writer from Oklahoma who published several books for young adults about Native Americans in the United States and Oklahoma history.

== Background and education ==
Robert Wayne McMurtry was born in San Antonio, Texas, in 1950. Robert, nicknamed Robby or Robbie, claimed to be Comanche descent; however, he was not American Indian.

McMurtry grew up in a military family and when the family was not living overseas they resided in Loco. There was little in the way of entertainment and friends, so he found enjoyment in reading comic books and drawing.

He began attending college in Chickasha, Oklahoma, but flunked out as an art major as the college almost exclusively supported abstract art. In college, McMurtry found a strong Native community and later in life would collaborate with the other artists he met during this time. He worked at a variety of jobs creating his art, teaching students, and other odd jobs to make his living.

== Artwork ==
McMurtry's artwork primarily focused on Native American subject matter. McMurtry worked in pencil, acrylic, mixed-media, and comic book style. McMurtry grew up in Loco, Oklahoma. McMurtry published several works such as The Life and Times of Ned Christie, Cherokee Patriot and Renegade.

McMurtry’s art predominantly focuses on pairing Native American stories with art. Inspired by his childhood obsession with comic books, he created several books featuring Native characters such as The Road to Medicine Lodge: Jesse Chisholm in the Indian Nations and Native Heart: The Life and Times of Ned Christie, Cherokee Patriot and Renegade.

McMurtry often taught children at the Chisholm Trail Heritage Center and taught for three years at the Art Explosion summer program which was sponsored by the Chisholm Trail Arts Council. McMurtry was a beloved teacher. He was heavily involved in his community, serving as the Cultural Coordinator for the Muscogee (Creek) Nation and assisted in the planning of the annual Western Spirit Celebration.

He won a variety of awards including the Redbud award in 2011 from the Oklahoma Travel Industry Association for an exhibition at the Chisholm Trail Heritage Center. In 1978, he was the Cherokee Nation's artist in residence. His work "Unarmed" is a part of the Gilcrease Museum's permanent collection and was donated in 2004. He was also a part of a team which built a permanent art installation, named "The Passage" at the Tennessee River Landing in Chattanooga, Tennessee, which was a major starting point for the Trail of Tears. McMurtry designed seven sculptures of stickball players as part of his contribution.

== Death ==
Police deputies killed McMurtry on August 1, 2012. They shot him at his home in Morris, Oklahoma. Two years after his death, the National Cowboy and Western Heritage Museum held an exhibition of McMurtry’s works.
