= Sidney Koreneff =

New Zealand French resistance worker

Sidney Koreneff (née Duigan, 4 November 1918 – 11 October 1997) was a New Zealand French resistance worker, newspaper managing director and Anglican priest. She was born in Wanganui, Wanganui, New Zealand on 4 November 1918.
