= Daniel Watkins (businessman) =

Daniel Anthony Watkins (24 February 1918 – 22 February 1982) was a notable New Zealand agrochemical distributor and manufacturer, businessman. He was born in New Plymouth, New Zealand, in 1918.
