= George McMurtry (engineer) =

New Zealand scientist and engineer

George Cannon McMurtry (14 November 1867 – 29 September 1918) was a New Zealand scientist, smelting engineer, mining manager and consultant, and orchardist. He was born in Camberwell, Surrey, England on 14 November 1867.
