= 1915 in New Zealand =

- Decades: 1890s; 1900s; 1910s; 1920s; 1930s
- See also: History of New Zealand; List of years in New Zealand; Timeline of New Zealand history

The following lists events that happened during 1915 in New Zealand.

World War I and New Zealand's participation in it dominate the year. Most notably, New Zealand troops take part in the landings at ANZAC cove, Gallipoli on 25 April, and the ensuing campaign.

The various political parties agree to form a wartime coalition in August, even though the Reform Party has an absolute majority in parliament.

Many sporting events are put on hold for the duration of the war, due to the number of men serving in the armed forces and the drive to conserve resources for the war effort.

== Incumbents ==
=== Regal and viceregal ===
- Head of State – George V
- Governor – Arthur Foljambe, 2nd Earl of Liverpool
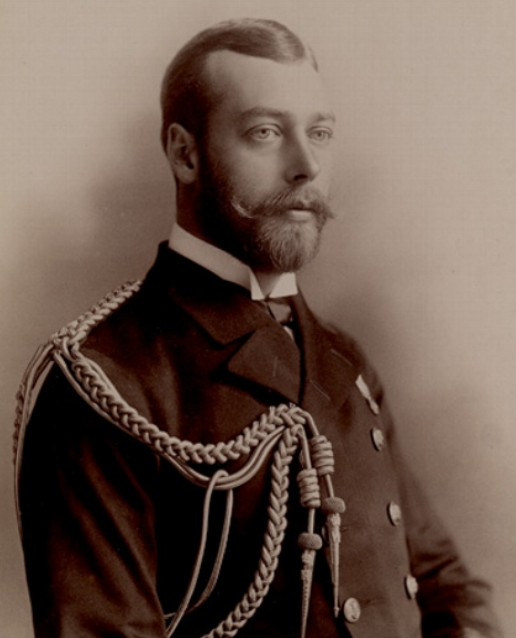
George V

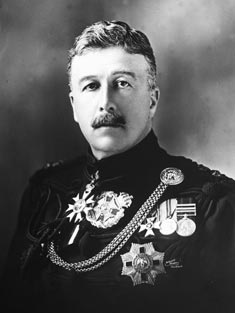
Lord Liverpool

=== Government ===
The 19th New Zealand Parliament commenced, initially with the Reform Party in power, but in August a wartime coalition government was formed, with Liberal party leader Joseph Ward becoming finance minister.

- Speaker of the House – Frederic Lang (Reform Party)
- Prime Minister – William Massey (Reform Party)
- Minister of Finance – James Allen until 12 August, then Joseph Ward
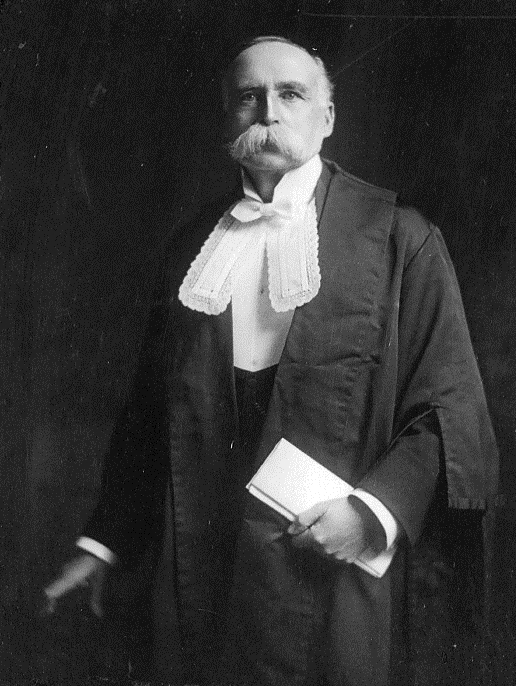
Frederic Lang

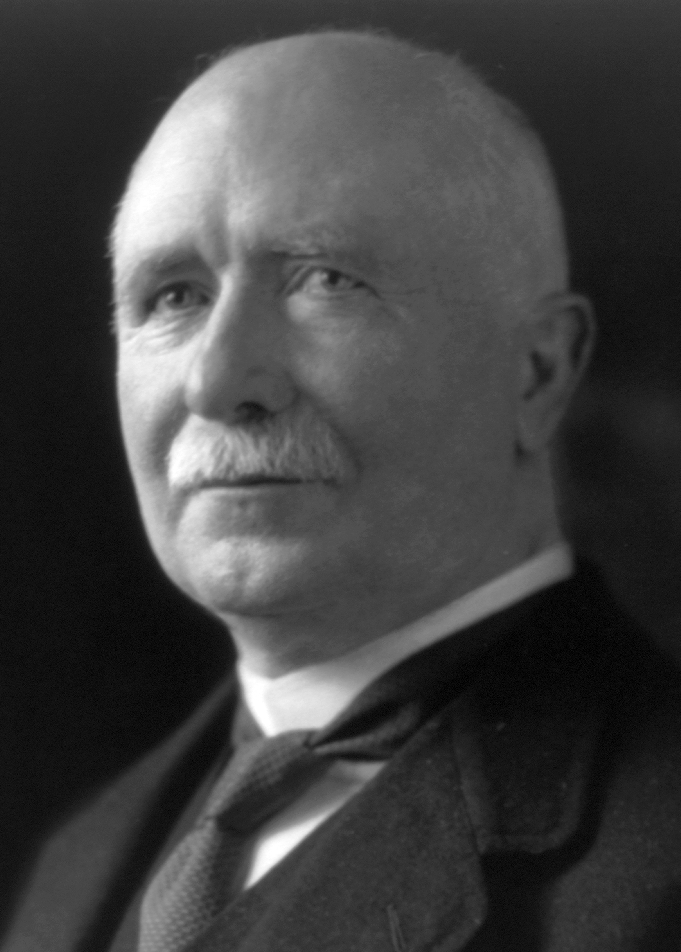
William Massey

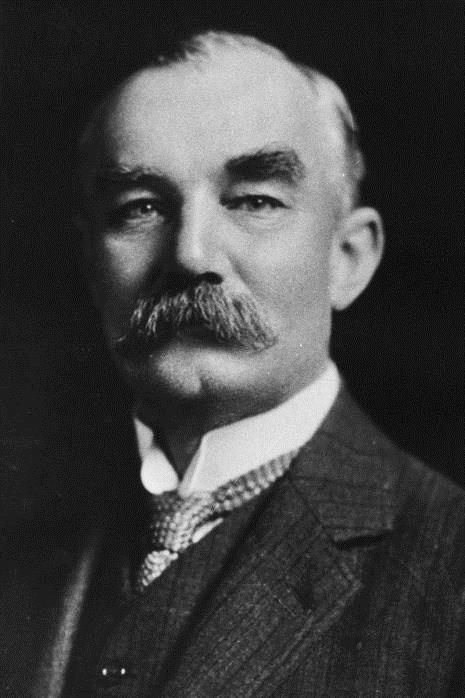
James Allen

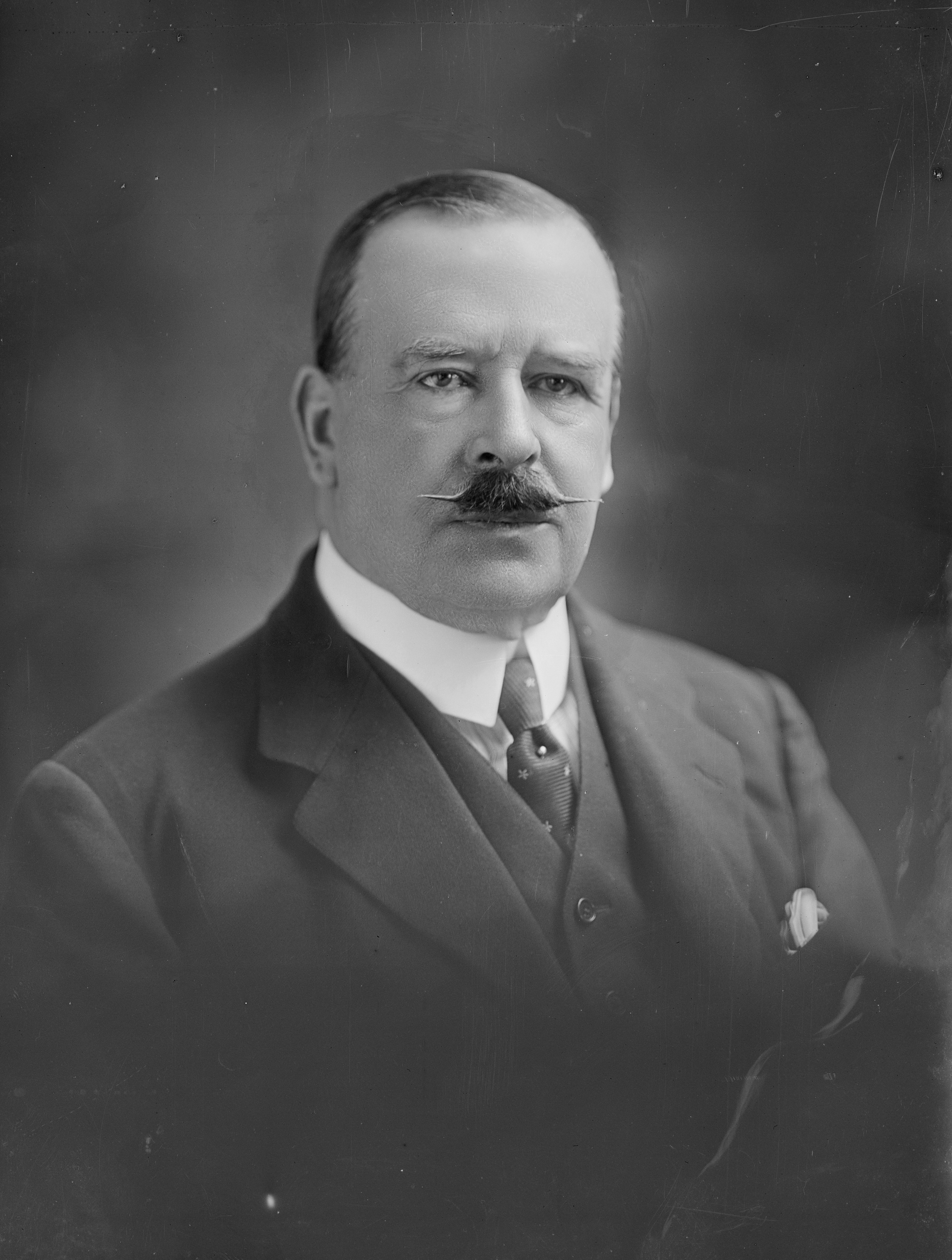
Joseph Ward

=== Parliamentary opposition ===
- Leader of the Opposition – Joseph Ward (Liberal Party). Ward retained the title even though he became part of the coalition government.
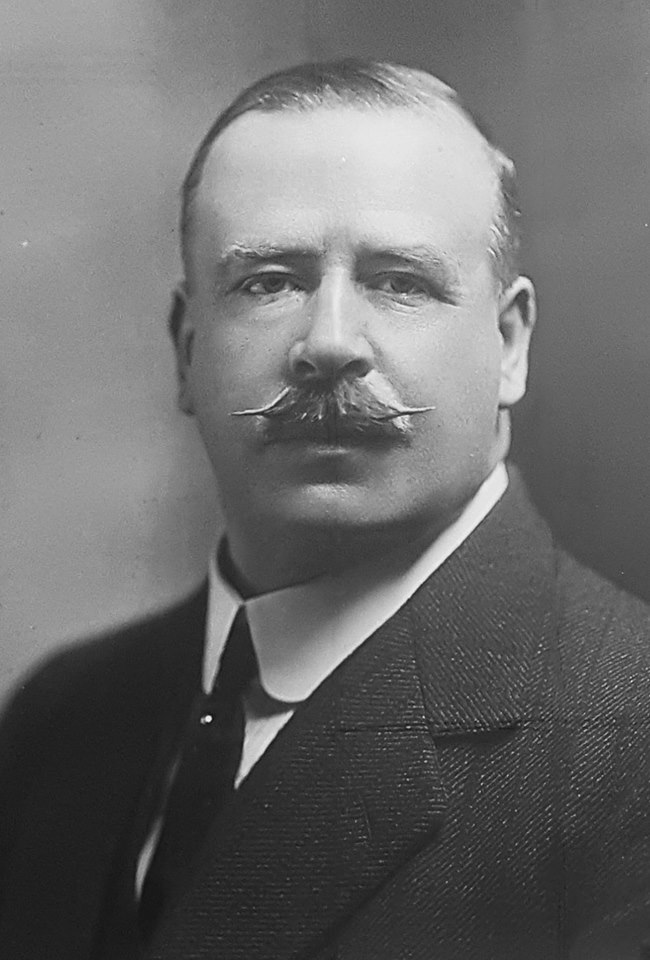
Joseph Ward

=== Judiciary ===
- Chief Justice – Sir Robert Stout
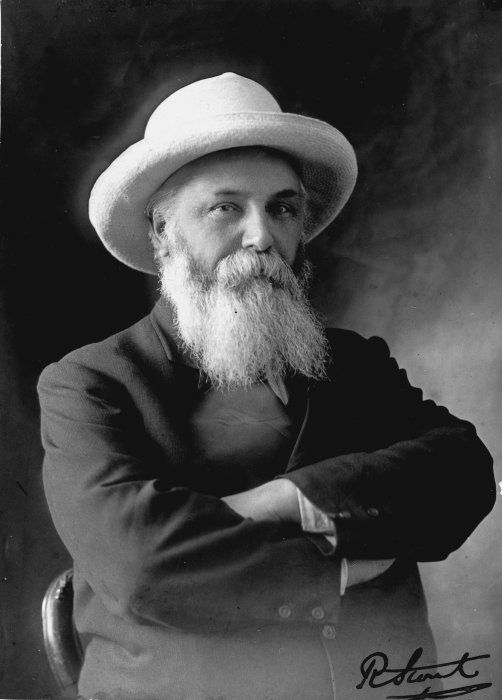
Robert Stout

=== Main centre leaders ===
- Mayor of Auckland – James Parr then James Gunson
- Mayor of Wellington – John Luke
- Mayor of Christchurch – Henry Holland
- Mayor of Dunedin – John Shacklock then James Clark
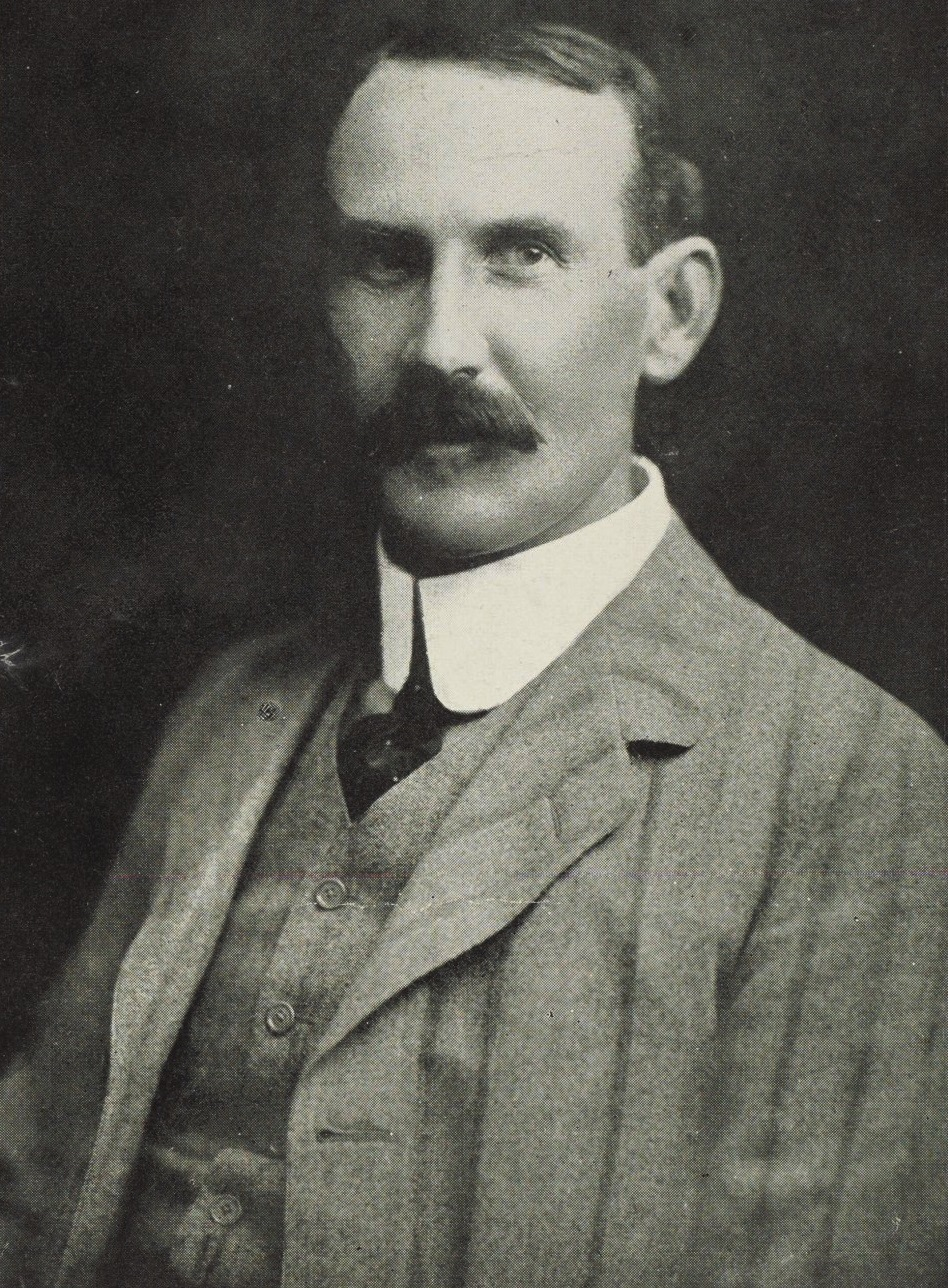
James Parr

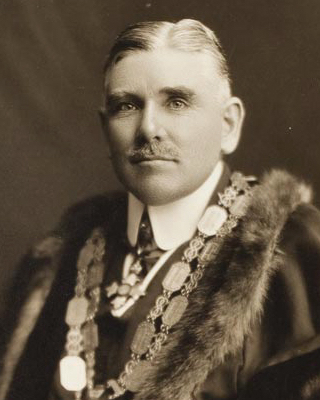
James Gunson

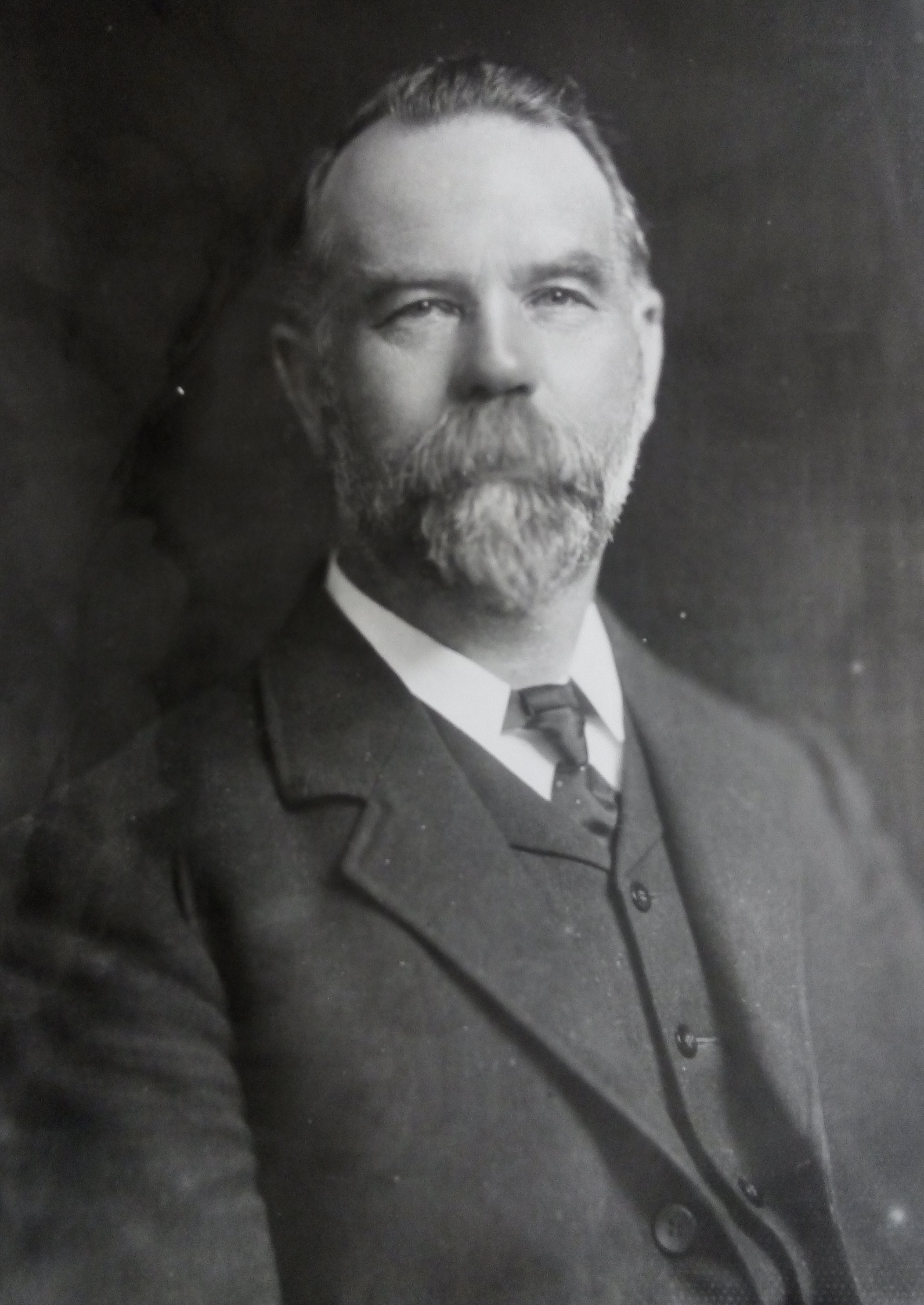
John Luke

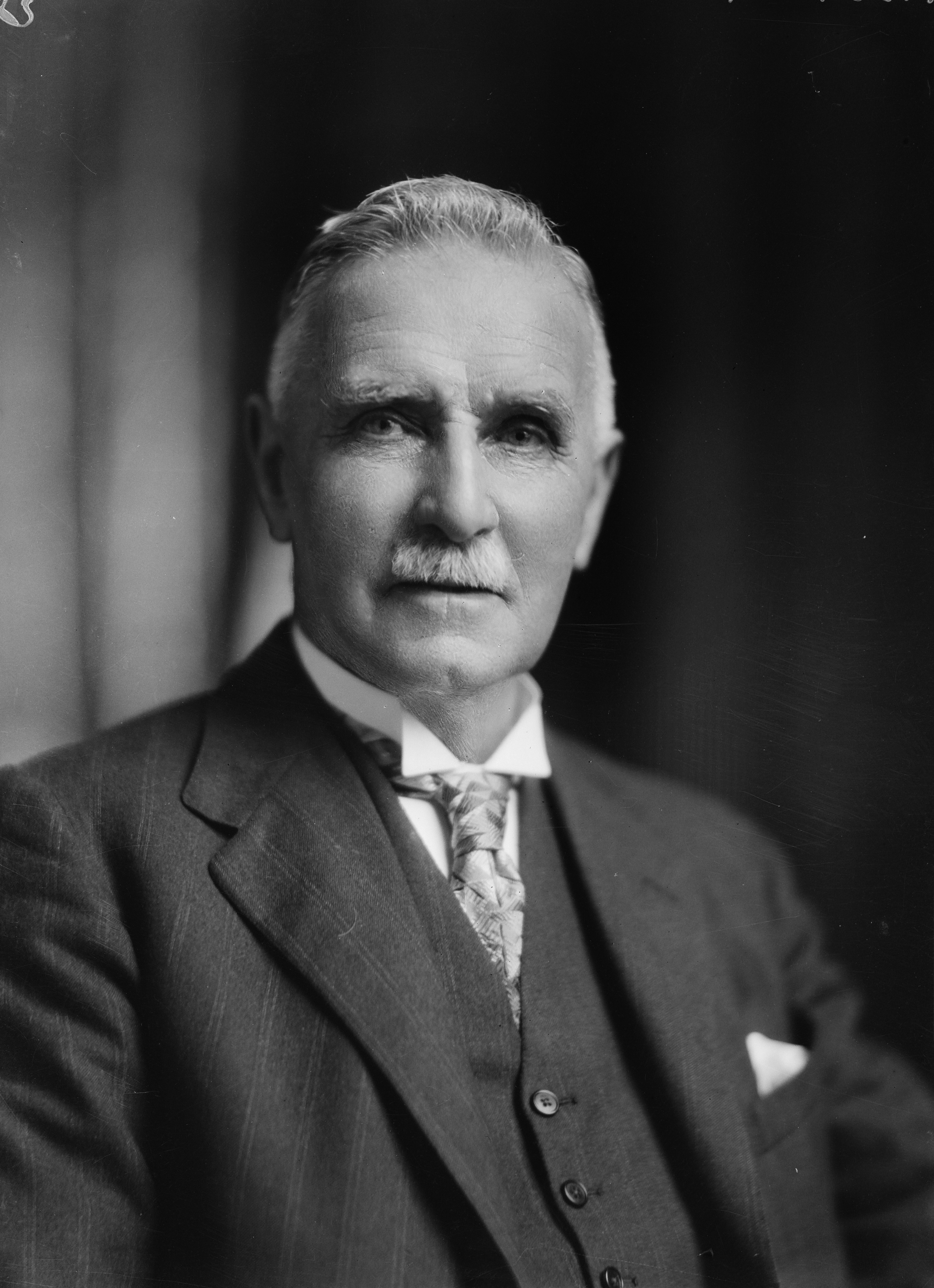
Henry Holland

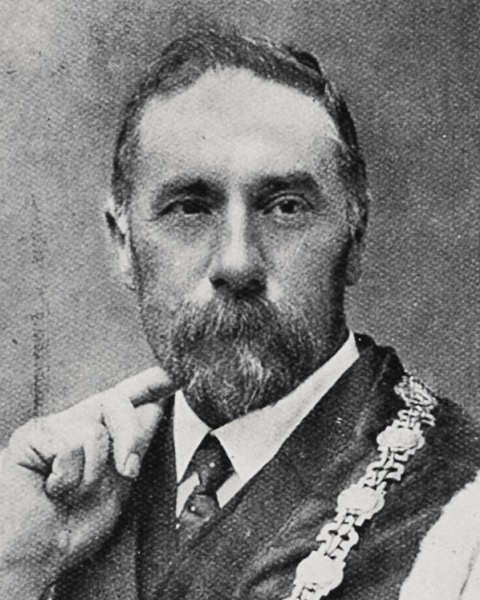
John Shacklock

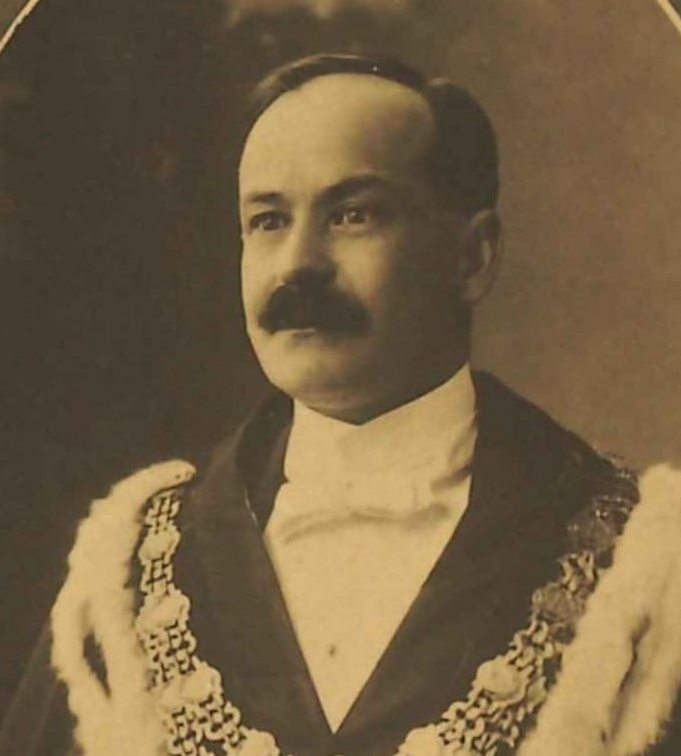
James Clark

== Events ==
- 1 January – First flight of the Walsh Brothers' Curtiss-type flying boat. The flight takes place at Bastion Point and it is the first such aircraft built and flown in the Southern Hemisphere.
- 14 February – The first contingent of 500 Māori soldiers sails for Egypt aboard SS Warrimoo. Earlier policy had been against 'native peoples' fighting in a European war.
- 25 April – New Zealand troops participate in the landings at Gallipoli.
- 23 October – Sinking of SS Marquette with 32 New Zealand deaths; mainly nurses and medical staff
- October – The New Zealand Flying School is started by the Walsh Brothers at Ōrākei. Its primary purpose is to train pilots for the Royal Flying Corps.
- November – The New Zealand Flying School moves to Kohimarama.
- 20 December – The last New Zealand troops are evacuated from Gallipoli.

Undated

- The Waikato Argus, established in 1896, merges into the Waikato Times.

== Arts and literature ==
See 1915 in art, 1915 in literature, Category:1915 books

=== Music ===
See: 1915 in music

=== Film ===
See: Category:1915 film awards, 1915 in film, List of New Zealand feature films, Cinema of New Zealand, Category:1915 films

== Sport ==
=== Chess ===
- The 28th New Zealand Chess Championship is held in Christchurch, and is won by Fedor Kelling of Wellington, his second title.

=== Golf ===
- The New Zealand Open championship and National Amateur Championships are not held due to the war.

=== Horse racing ===
==== Harness racing ====
- New Zealand Trotting Cup – Country Belle
- Auckland Trotting Cup – Cathedral Chimes

==== Thoroughbred racing ====
- New Zealand Cup – Tangihou
- Auckland Cup – Balboa
- Wellington Cup – Pavlova
- New Zealand Derby – Desert Gold

=== Lawn bowls ===
The national outdoor lawn bowls championships are held in Auckland.

- Men's singles champion – M. Walker (Ponsonby Bowling Club)
- Men's pair champions – G.A. Blackwood, A. Smellie (skip) (Green Island Bowling Club)
- Men's fours champions – N.H. Nash, S. Dixon, F.J. Tasker, J.A. Nash (skip) (Palmerston North Bowling Club)

=== Rugby union ===
- The Ranfurly Shield (held by Wellington) is not contested as interprovincial matches are cancelled due to the war.

=== Soccer ===
- Provincial league champions:
  - Auckland – Brotherhood
  - Canterbury – Christchurch Club
  - Hawke's Bay – Waipukurau
  - Otago – HSOB
  - Southland – No competition
  - Wanganui – No competition
  - Wellington – Wellington Thistle

== Births ==
=== January–March ===
- 3 January – Robert Hurst, nuclear chemist
- 7 January – Mary Martin, netball player
- 22 January
  - Tom Burtt, cricketer and field hockey player
  - Mona Leydon, swimmer
- 13 February – Raniera Ellison, fishing company manager
- 15 February – Jimmy James, dancer, dance teacher and cabaret proprietor
- 22 February
  - James Pirret, lawn bowler
  - John Scandrett, cricketer
- 2 March – Bill Crawford-Crompton, air force pilot and commander
- 5 March – Hardy Browning, potter, local politician
- 11 March – Amelia Batistich, writer
- 22 March – Fen Cresswell, cricketer
- 23 March – Cecil Devine, Standardbred racehorse driver
- 28 March – Ray Emery, cricketer

=== April–June ===
- 3 April – Philip Blakeley, electrical engineer and engineering administrator
- 14 April – Leonard Trent, air force pilot, Victoria Cross recipient
- 22 April – Geoff Moon, naturalist, photographer and veterinarian
- 30 April – Helen Mason, potter
- 5 May – Snow Bowman, rugby union player
- 25 May – James Austin, meteorology academic
- 26 May – Terence Vaughan, pianist, conductor, composer and performing arts administrator
- 27 May – Alan McKenzie, disabled artist, entertainer
- 2 June – Jim Newhook, veterinary science academic
- 3 June – Jack Lewin, public servant and unionist
- 4 June – Walter Hadlee, cricketer and cricket administrator
- 10 June – Inia Te Wiata, opera singer, actor, carver and artist
- 27 June – Graham Botting, cricketer
- 30 June – Gordon Rowe, cricketer and cricket umpire

=== July–September ===
- 10 July – Jack Parker, boxer
- 29 July – Tristan Hegglun, rower, rugby union player, politician
- 31 July – Theo Schoon, artist, photographer and carver
- 3 August – Harold Tyrie, athlete and athletics coach
- 8 August – John Kennedy-Good, politician and dentist
- 11 August – Jack Skinner, association football player
- 18 August – Fred Lucas, air force and commercial pilot, tourism operator
- 21 August – Lena Manuel, community leader
- 1 September – Allan Dick, politician
- 4 September – Ethel Divers, netball player
- 5 September – Peter Tait, politician
- 15 September – Jimmy Ell, cricketer
- 19 September – Ron Moore, soldier
- 23 September – Has Catley, rugby union player

=== October–December ===
- 1 October – Jim Davidson, historian
- 9 October – John Rodgers, Roman Catholic bishop
- 22 October – Pat Twohill, actor and radio announcer
- 26 October – Sydney Goodsir Smith, poet, artist, dramatist and novelist
- 31 October – Muriel Boswell, netball player
- 1 November – Harry Lapwood, soldier and politician
- 2 November – Douglas Lilburn, composer
- 5 November – Toby Hill, watersider and trade unionist
- 9 November – Florence Humphries, trade unionist and consumer advocate
- 10 November – Duncan MacIntyre, soldier and politician
- 11 November – Ben Gascoigne, astronomer
- 14 November – David Thomson, soldier and politician
- 30 November – Peter Hanan, swimmer
- 6 December – Alan Sayers, athlete, journalist and writer
- 10 December – Nicky Barr, rugby union player and World War II fighter ace
- 15 December – Joy Lamason, cricketer
- 17 December – Philip Adams, diplomat
- 22 December – Dorothy Neal White, librarian

== Deaths ==
=== January–March ===
- 15 January – William Shepherd Allen, politician (born 1831)
- 26 January – Frank Lethbridge, politician (born 1852)
- 25 February – Ann Alabaster, schoolteacher (born 1842)
- 26 February – Edward Richardson, engineer, politician (born c.1830)
- 1 March – Francis Arkwright, politician (born 1846)
- 13 March – George Parker, politician (born 1839)
- 15 March – John Grimes, Roman Catholic bishop (born 1842)
- 23 March – John Bollard, politician (born c.1839)
- 31 March – Allan Marshall, river captain and engineer (born 1851)

=== April–June ===
- 6 April – Felix McGuire, politician (born 1847)
- 18 April – Francis St Omer, baker, restaurateur, politician (born 1827)
- 25 April
  - George Chamier, novelist (born 1842)
  - Nat Williams, cricketer (born 1878)
- 27 April – William Rhodes-Moorhouse, pilot, Victoria Cross recipient (born 1887)
- 7 May – James Livingston, soldier, community leader (born 1840)
- 8 May – Charles Savory, rugby league player, boxer (born 1889)
- 9 May – Anthony Wilding, tennis player (born 1883)
- 17 May – Alexander McNeill, politician (born 1833)
- 21 May – William Henry Skinner, architect (born 1838)
- 2 June – Te Hapimana Tauke, Ngāti Ruanui leader, mission teacher, historian (born c.1810)
- 6 June – Edward Cephas John Stevens, land agent, cricketer, politician (born 1837)
- 11 June – James Williams, runholder, orchardist (born 1837)

=== July–September ===
- 15 July – Wiremu Kerei Nikora, politician (born 1853)
- 30 July – William Burn, military pilot (born 1891)
- 8 August – William Malone, soldier (born 1859)
- 9 August – Norman Hastings, soldier (born 1879)
- 11 August – Alfred Shout, soldier, Victoria Cross recipient (born 1882)
- 20 August – George Beetham, politician, alpinist (born 1840)
- 2 September – Richard Twopeny, journalist, newspaper editor (born 1857)
- 11 September – John McLachlan, politician (born 1840)
- 25 September – Hugh Butterworth, cricketer, schoolteacher (born 1885)

=== October–December ===
- 8 October – Thomas Cawthron, businessman, philanthropist (born 1833)
- 14 October – John Duthie, politician, mayor of Wellington (1889–90) (born 1841)
- 15 October – John A. Millar, politician (born 1855)
- 27 October – Leonard Harper, politician (born 1832)
- 29 October – Mrs Chippy, cat
- 3 November – Thomas Kempthorne, manufacturing chemist, philanthropist (born c.1834)
- 12 November – James Ogilvie-Grant, 11th Earl of Seafield, nobleman (born 1876)
- 13 November – Alfred Dillon, politician (born 1841)
- 9 December – Wi Pere, politician (born 1837)
- 13 December – David Boyle, 7th Earl of Glasgow, Governor of New Zealand (1892–97) (born 1833)
- 15 December – William Crawford, brewer, politician, photographer (born 1844)
- 18 December – Matilda Lo Keong, storekeeper, first known Chinese female immigrant to New Zealand (born c.1855)
- 22 December – Sir Joshua Williams, politician, jurist (born 1837)
- 27 December – Charles Christie Graham, politician (born 1835)
- 29 December – Frank Buckland, politician (born 1847)

== See also ==
- History of New Zealand
- List of years in New Zealand
- Military history of New Zealand
- Timeline of New Zealand history
- Timeline of New Zealand's links with Antarctica
- Timeline of the New Zealand environment
