= Chamier =

Chamier is a surname, and may refer to:

- Adrian Chamier (1883–1974), British Air Commodore
- Anthony Chamier (1725–1780), British official and politician
- Daniel Chamier (1564–1621), Huguenot minister in France
- Edward Chamier (1840–1892), French chess master
- Edward Maynard Des Champs Chamier (1866–1945), British judge in India
- Edwina Chamier, Canadian skier, wife of Adrian
- Frederick Chamier (1796–1870), English naval officer and novelist
- George Chamier (1842–1915), New Zealand engineer and novelist
- John Adrian Chamier (1883–1974), British officer of the Royal Air Force
- Wolfgang von Chamier-Glisczinski (1894–1943), German general

== See also ==
- Coulounieix-Chamiers, Dordogne, France
