= Jimmy James =

Jimmy James may refer to:

== People ==
=== Entertainers ===
- Jimmy James (comedian) (1892–1965), British comedian
- Jimmy James (dancer) (1915–1992), New Zealand dancer
- Jimmy James (singer) (1940–2024), British soul singer with The Vagabonds
- Jimmy James (musician) (born 1959), American guitarist with Tommy Tutone
- Jimmy James, guitarist for Delvon Lamarr Organ Trio

=== Military ===
- Jimmy James, the nickname of Bertram James (1915–2008), RAF officer who survived "The Great Escape"
- Jimmy James, the nickname of Hugh James (1922–2015)

=== Australian trackers ===
- Jimmy James (tracker, died 1945)
- Jimmy James (tracker, 1913–1991)

=== Other people ===
- J. R. James (1912–1980), British town planner
- N. D. G. James (1912–1993), English historian of forestry
- Jimmy James, aviator who flew the first package for Western Air Express
- Jimmy James (civil servant), British army officer and civil servant

== Other ==
- Jimmy James and the Blue Flames, a short-lived band led by Jimi Hendrix
- "Jimmy James" (song), a 1992 Beastie Boys song
- Jimmy James, a NewsRadio character portrayed by Stephen Root

== See also ==
- James James (1833–1902), Welsh harpist
- James Alton James (1864–1962), American educator and historian
- Jim James (born 1978), American vocalist for band My Morning Jacket
