= ADCC =

ADCC may refer to:

- Antibody-dependent cell-mediated cytotoxicity
- Air Defence Cadet Corps, an organisation in Britain from 1938 to 1941
- Abu Dhabi Combat Club Submission Fighting World Championship
- Adenoid cystic carcinoma, a rare type of cancer
