= Daniel Chamier =

French protestant theologian (1564–1621)

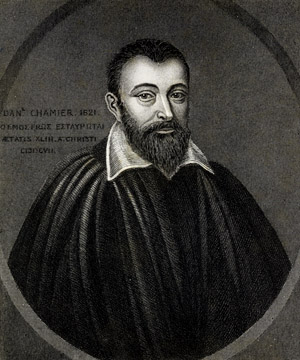
Daniel Chamier

Daniel Chamier (1564–1621) was a Huguenot minister in France, founder of the Academy of Montpellier and author.

== Life and work ==
Chamier was born at the castle of Le Mont, near Mocas and west of Grenoble. His father was from Avignon and a Protestant convert, a pastor at Montélimar. Daniel studied at the now defunct University of Orange (1365-1793) and at Geneva under Theodore Beza and Antoine de la Faye (1540–1615), in the period 1583 to 1589. He was ordained minister at Montpellier, and about 1595 succeeded his father at Montélimar.

His provincial synod appointed him deputy to the National Synod at Saumur, and the gathering at Loudun in 1596. He was involved in drafting the Edict of Nantes, and brought the Edict to the Synod of Montpellier in 1598. In 1601 and 1602 he took part in discussions at Montpellier with the Jesuits Pierre Coton and Gaultier. In 1603 he presided over the National Synod at Gap, France, where an article was added to the Reformed Confession of faith declaring the Pope to be the Antichrist.

In 1607 Henry IV of France granted him permission as representative of the Church of Dauphiné to establish an academy at Montpellier, and he became professor there. Chamier returned, however, after a short time to Montélimar. In 1612 he became pastor and professor at Montauban. When Louis XIII besieged the city in 1621, Chamier sent his students to the walls, and was mortally wounded during the defence.

Daniel Chamier I died on 17 October 1621, he was killed during the siege of Montauban

== Family ==
He was married to Antoinette Moissart, (although John Quick, who knew the Chamiers in the late 17th century referred to her as Antoinette de Portal). They had seven children, four sons and three daughters. The children were: Jacques Chamier I; Adrien Chamier I (abt 1590 - 5 February 1670/71) who married Madelaine (or Marguerite) Allard; Etienne Chamier; Louise Chamier, who married Jehan Boudet in 1659 and had five children (Pierre, Jean, Daniel, Adrien and Antoinette); Madeleine Chamier I (born 28 July 1595) who married twice, firstly to Jehan Guarsin (also later spelt Garcin) who died and Madeleine Chamier I remarried on 25th April 1623 to Pierre Testas I; Marguerite Chamier (born 25 July 1597 Montélimar), who married Phillipe De Nautonnier on 10th January 1618/19 Montauban), and had five children (Adrien de Nautonnier, Jacques, Madelaine, Rachelle, and another daughter (name unknown);and the youngest child of Daniel Chamier I, François Chamier.

English actor Daniel Craig is among his descendants (link partially broken by John Ezechiel Chamier née 'Deschamps' but requested to be changed by his uncle Anthony Chamier and ended with Georgette Grace Chamier who married John Charin Wroughton and only Chamier sibling with children), as well as Anthony Chamier, George Chamier, Frederick Chamier, Edward Chamier and John Adrian Chamier.

== Works ==
He was a supralapsarian but differed from John Calvin concerning Christ's descent into hell and angels. He wrote:

- Dispute de la vocation des ministres de l'Église reformée (La Rochelle, 1589);
- Epistolæ jesuiticæ (Geneva, 1599);
- La confusion des disputes papistes (1600);
- Disputatio scholastico-theologica de œcumenico pontifice (1601);
- Panstratia Catholica, seu Corpus Controversiarum adversus Pontificios (Geneva, 1606);
- La Honte de Babylone (Sédan, 1612);
- La Jésuitomanie (Montauban, 1618);
- Corpus Theologicum, seu Loci Communes Theologici (Geneva, 1653);
- Journal du voyage de M. D. Chamier à Paris et à la cour de Henri IV. en 1607 (ed. C. Read, Paris, 1858).
