= Keong =

Keong may refer to:

- Ng Chin-Keong, Former professor of Chinese History at the National University of Singapore
- Tan Keong Choon (1916–2015), Chinese industrialist, community leader and philanthropist in Singapore
- Chan Sek Keong, SPMP, DUBC, DUT, SC (born 1937), the third Chief Justice of Singapore
- Chen Lip Keong, Malaysian businessman
- Chow Chee Keong (1948–2018), Malaysian football goalkeeper
- Fong Chi Keong (born 1947), businessman, member of the Legislative Assembly of Macau
- Foo Kok Keong KMN AMN BSD (born 1963), former badminton star from Malaysia
- Kuok Io Keong (born 1976), race driver
- Liew Vui Keong (born 1960), Malaysian politician
- Loh Sea Keong, Malaysian professional cyclist who rides for Thailand Continental Cycling Team
- Mah Siew Keong (born 1961), Malaysian politician
- Matilda Lo Keong (1856–1915), New Zealand storekeeper, homemaker and community worker
- Wee Choo Keong (born 1953), Malaysian politician
- Dai-Keong Lee (1915–2005), American composer
- Chan Nai-keong, CBE, JP (1931–2003), Hong Kong engineer and government official
- Tan Keong Saik (1850–1909), Singaporean businessman
- Keong Sim, Korean-American actor
- Su Keong Siong, known as Thomas Su, Malaysian lawyer and politician of Chinese descent
- Ryu Tae-keong (born 1961), South Korean sprinter
- Chai Keong Toh, Singapore-born computer scientist, engineer, professor, and chief technology officer

== See also ==
- Keong Emas (Golden Snail), a popular Javanese folklore about a princess in a golden snail shell
- Kheng Hock Keong, the largest and oldest temple to the Chinese sea-goddess Mazu in Yangon, Burma
- Keong Saik Road, a one-way road located in Chinatown within the Outram Planning Area in Singapore
- Kong Hock Keong Temple (Goddess of Mercy Temple), Taoist temple in George Town, Penang, Malaysia
- Kelong
- Kenong
- Kepong
