= John Courtenay (1738–1816) =

18th/19th-century Irish officer in the British Army and politician

John Courtenay (22 August 1738 – 24 March 1816) was an Irish officer in the British Army who became a politician in England. He was a Whig member of Parliament (MP) at Westminster from 1780 to 1807, and again in 1812.

Courtenay was the second son of Henry Courtenay, a revenue officer from Newry, County Down in the Kingdom of Ireland. He was educated at Drogheda Grammar School.

He was MP for Tamworth from 1780 to 1796, and then for Appleby from 1796 to 1807. He was re-elected for Appleby at the 1812 general election, but resigned his seat shortly after Parliament met in December.

A member both of Brooks's and Whig Club, Courtenay aligned with Charles James Fox against the First Pitt ministry. As such, he supported reform measures, favouring the repeal of the Test Act in Scotland in 1791, abolition of the slave trade, and parliamentary reform; helped manage the impeachment of Warren Hastings; and, in A Poetical and Philosophical Essay on the French Revolution (1793), assailed Edmund Burke for his inveterate hostility to constitutional innovation and popular sovereignty.

With Sir Francis Burdett, in 1798 Courtenay supported the campaign of Catherine Despard to publicise and protest the conditions under which her Irish husband Colonel Edward Despard and other political radicals were held following the suspension of habeas corpus which Courtenay had opposed. In a House of Commons debate on the continued suspension, Coutenay read a letter from Catherine detailing the harsh conditions under which her husband was confined at in Coldbath Fields Prison. Edward Despard, a member of the London Corresponding Society and a United Irishman remained in prison for three years. In 1803 he was tried and executed for treason.

After the Acts of Union in 1800 he welcomed the new Irish MPs to the Commons, but protested the parliamentary oath of allegiance which continued to prevent members of Ireland's Roman Catholic majority from being seated in the House.

Courtenay was the surveyor-general of the ordnance from 1783 to 1784, and a lord of the treasury from 1806 to 1807 in the Grenville ministry.

Parliament of Great Britain
Preceded by Thomas de Grey; Anthony Chamier	Member of Parliament for Tamworth; 1780 – 1796; With: Anthony Chamier to November 1780; John Calvert 1780–84; John Calvert II 1784–90; Sir Robert Peel, Bt from 1790	Succeeded by Sir Robert Peel, Bt; Thomas Carter
Preceded by Hon. William Grimston; Hon. John Rawdon	Member of Parliament for Appleby; 1796 – 1800; With: Hon. John Tufton 1796–99; Robert Adair from 1799	Succeeded by Parliament of the United Kingdom
Parliament of the United Kingdom
Preceded by Parliament of Great Britain	Member of Parliament for Appleby; 1801 – 1807; With: Robert Adair to 1802; Sir Philip Francis 1802–07	Succeeded by Viscount Howick; James Ramsay Cuthbert
Preceded by James Ramsay Cuthbert; Nicholas Ridley-Colborne	Member of Parliament for Appleby; October 1812 – December 1812; With: James Lowther	Succeeded by James Lowther; George Tierney
Military offices
Preceded by Hon. Thomas Pelham	Surveyor-General of the Ordnance; 1783–1784	Succeeded by James Luttrell
