= James Beauregard-Smith =

Australian murderer (1943–2024)

- Born: James George Beauregard-Smith; 1943; New South Wales, Australia
- Died: November 2024 (aged 81); Northfield, South Australia, Australia
- Convictions: Rape, murder
- Penalty: Life imprisonment

James George Beauregard-Smith (1943 – November 2024) was an Australian convicted rapist and triple murderer who served a life prison sentence. Originally from Sydney, he moved to South Australia in 1975.

On 16 March 1978, the Supreme Court jury found Beauregard-Smith guilty of murdering nine-year-old Craig Alan Holland. Beauregard-Smith was having an affair with Sandra Holland, Craig Holland's mother, for several months before the murder.

The bodies of Sandra Holland and her eldest son, Scott, were found by police under trees and branches in Woodside. Craig Holland was found buried under the floorboards of the family home.

In August 1982, he fled custody while participating in an SES event near Renmark. An aboriginal tracker, Jimmy James, was asked to help find him. On 10 November 1992, Beauregard-Smith was sentenced to twelve months imprisonment for escaping custody.

On 8 April 1994, one week after his release from prison on parole, he raped a girl at Cudlee Creek in South Australia. On 15 November 1994, Beauregard-Smith was convicted of the rape and was sentenced to twelve years imprisonment, later reduced to eight years on appeal. Due to Beauregard-Smith being on parole when the rape was committed, his parole in the relation to the sentence for murder was revoked and he became liable to serve the balance of that sentence. A non-parole period of 15 years was set to begin 25 November 1994, the date when the applicant was sentenced in relation to the conviction for rape. On 28 November 2024, it was announced that Beauregard-Smith had died at the Yatala Labour Prison health centre, at the age of 81.
