= Waikato =

Region of New Zealand

- Region
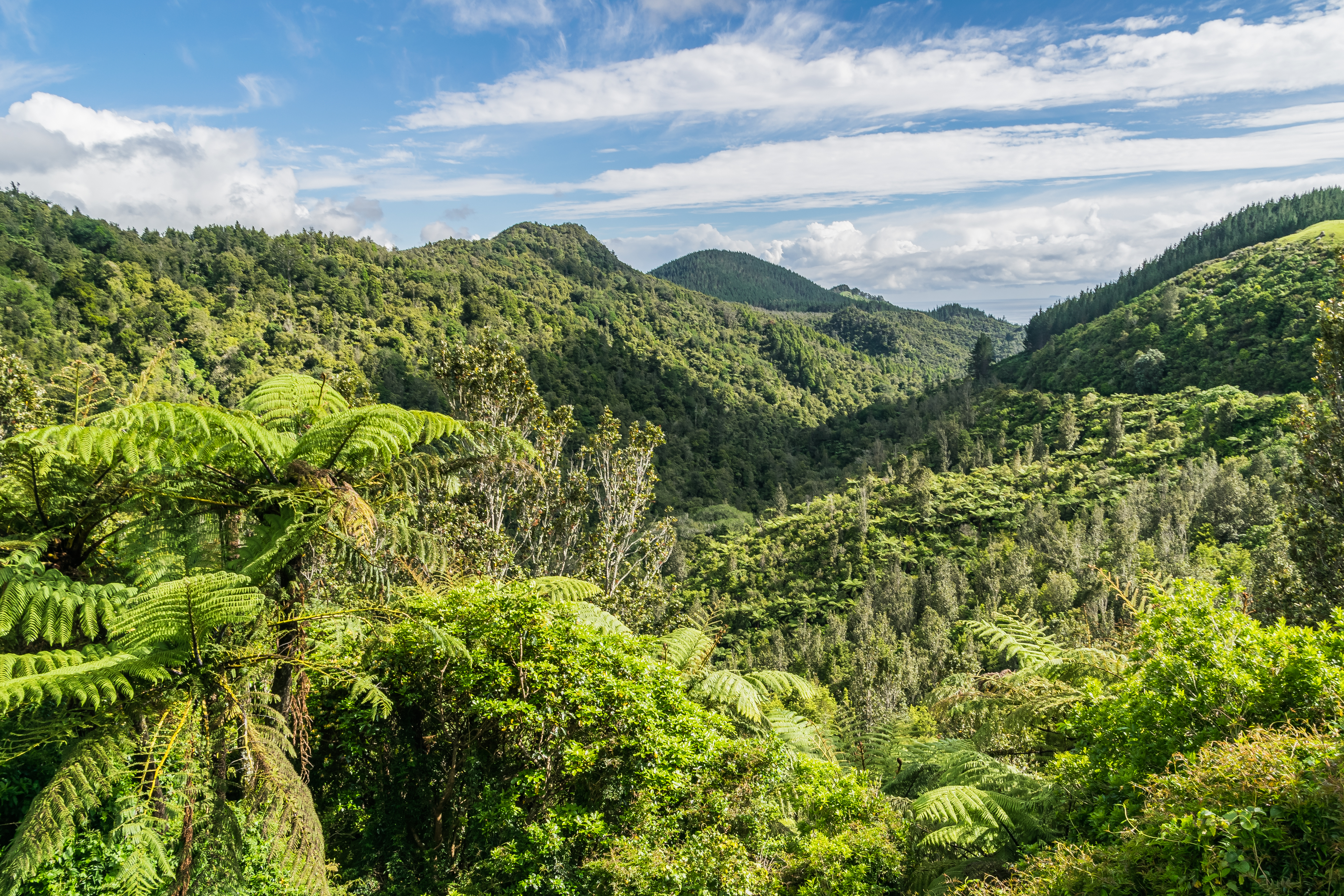
- Landscape of Waikato

- Waikato within New Zealand
- Coordinates: 37.8°S 175.4°E
- Country: New Zealand
- Island: North Island
- Seat: Hamilton City

Government
  - Type: Regional council
  - Body: Waikato Regional Council
  - Chair: Warren Maher
  - Deputy Chair: Mich'eal Downard

Area
  - Land: 23,901.09 km^{2} (9,228.26 sq mi)

Population (June 2025)
  - Total: 532,100
  - Density: 22.26/km^{2} (57.66/sq mi)

GDP
  - Total: NZ$32.558 billion (2021) (4th)
  - Per capita: NZ$63,713 (2021)
- HDI (2023): 0.931 very high · 8th
- Website: www.waikatoregion.govt.nz

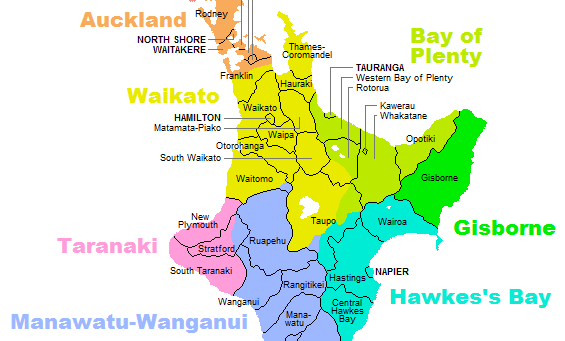
Territorial authorities in Waikato region before 2010

The Waikato (/ˈwaɪkætoʊ/, Māori pronunciation: [ˈwaikato]) is a region of the upper North Island of New Zealand. It covers the Waikato District, Waipā District, Matamata-Piako District, South Waikato District and Hamilton City, as well as Hauraki, Coromandel Peninsula, the northern King Country, much of the Taupō District, and parts of the Rotorua Lakes District. It is governed by the Waikato Regional Council.

The Waikato stretches from Coromandel Peninsula in the north, to the north-eastern slopes of Mount Ruapehu in the south, and spans the North Island from the west coast, through the Waikato and Hauraki to Coromandel Peninsula on the east coast. Broadly, the extent of the region is the Waikato River catchment. Other major catchments are those of the Waihou, Piako, Awakino and Mōkau rivers. The region is bounded by Auckland on the north, Bay of Plenty on the east, Hawke's Bay on the south-east, and Manawatū-Whanganui and Taranaki on the south. Waikato Region is the fourth largest region in the country in area and population: It has a land area of 23,901.09 km^{2} (9,228.26 mi^{2}) and a population of 532,100 (June 2025).

The region encompasses all or part of eleven territorial authorities, the most of any region of New Zealand. It is centred on the Waikato which consists of Waikato District, Matamata-Piako District, Waipā District, South Waikato District and Hamilton City. In descending order of land area the eleven territorial authorities are Taupō District (part), Waikato District, Waitomo District (part), Thames-Coromandel District, Ōtorohanga District, South Waikato District, Matamata-Piako District, Waipā District, Hauraki District, Rotorua Lakes District (part), and Hamilton City.

== Name and etymology ==
The name for the region is taken from the Waikato River; waikato is a Māori word traditionally translated as "flowing water" (specifically, wai = "water" and kato = "the pull of the river current in the sea").

When Waikato is used in spoken language some people use it in the definite article, "the Waikato", whereas some people do not use "the". It is unknown why a difference is made. "The" usually refers to a smaller region than the Waikato local government region. Two definitions that would meet with wide acceptance are those of the Waikato rugby football union and of Hamilton Waikato tourism.

== Geography ==
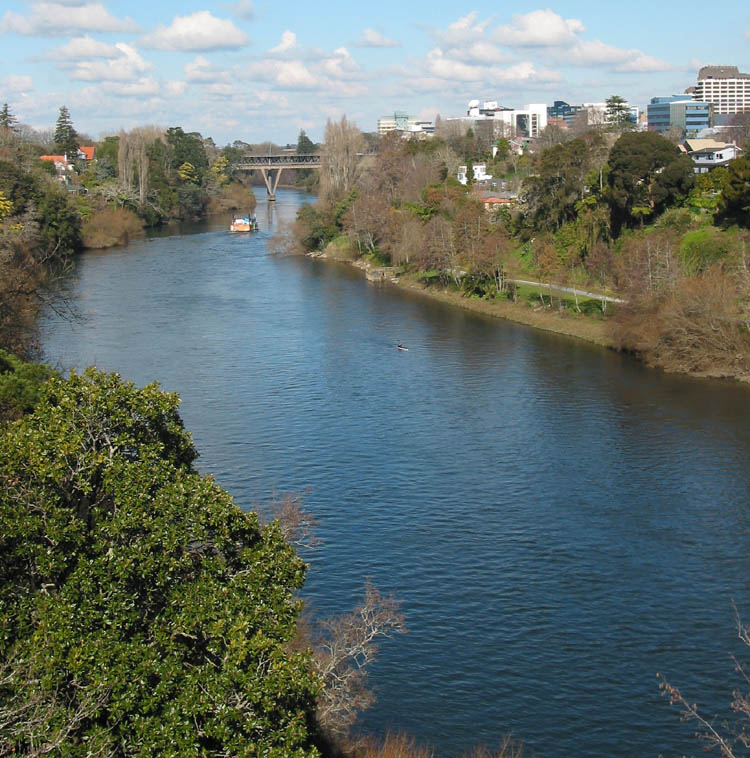
Waikato River passing through Hamilton

To the west, the region is bounded by the Tasman Sea. The coastal region is largely rough hill country, known locally as the Hakarimata Range, though it is more gently undulating in the north, closer to the mouth of the Waikato River. The coast is punctured by three large natural harbours: Raglan Harbour, Aotea Harbour, and Kāwhia Harbour. The area around Raglan is noted for its volcanic black sand beaches and for its fine surfing conditions at Manu Bay and Ruapuke beach.

To the east of the coastal hills lies the broad alluvial plain of the Waikato River. This region has a wet temperate climate, and the land is largely pastoral farmland created by European settlers draining the extensive natural swamps, although it also contains undrained peat swamp such as the 200 km^{2} (77 mi^{2}) peat dome south of Ngatea. It is in the broad undulating Waikato Plains that most of the region's population resides, and the land is intensively farmed with both livestock, mainly dairy cattle but with sheep farming on the hillier west margins, and crops such as maize. The area around Cambridge has many thoroughbred stables.

The north of the region around Te Kauwhata produces some of New Zealand's best wines. Dozens of small shallow lakes lie in this area, the largest of which is Lake Waikare.

To the east, the land rises towards the forested slopes of the Kaimai and Mamaku Ranges. The upper reaches of the Waikato River are used for hydroelectricity, helped by several large artificial lakes in the region's south-east. The lowest and earliest-created such lake is Lake Karapiro, now developed as a world-class rowing centre, where the world championships were held in 2010. The river flows out of the country's largest lake, Lake Taupō, which is served by several important fishing rivers such as the Tongariro, on the Central Plateau, draining the eastern side of Mount Ruapehu and its neighbours.

The climate is mild and temperate with moderate rainfall of 1,200 to 1,600 mm (47 to 63 in) per annum, with the higher western hills having the most rain. Summers are drier with typical maximum temperatures of 22–28 degrees Celsius and overnight lows of 12–16 degrees. Summer droughts occur one year in ten. Typical winter maxima are 10–16 degrees Celsius, with lows generally ranging from 0–8 degrees. Depressions experience regular morning fog, under anticyclonic conditions, which burns off by late morning to produce many still, clear sunny days. Morning frosts are also common during winter anticyclones. Another distinctive feature is the low average wind speed in the interior basin due to the sheltering influence of the hills and mountains to the west and south-west. The prevailing winter wind is from the south-west. The Waikato has very high sunshine hours by world standards, averaging 2200 hours per year or about 40% higher than in the UK. This results in rapid growth of grass, crops and ornamental plants.

Hamilton Waikato takes in the local government areas of Hamilton City, the southern part of Waikato district, Waipā district, most of Matamata-Piako district and the South Waikato district. Hamilton Waikato tourism takes in additionally the northern part of Waikato district (Tuakau and other centres), the northern King Country (Waitomo and Ōtorohanga districts), and the Te Aroha district.

The parts of Waikato region beyond these limits are usually identified as Thames Valley and/or Hauraki/Coromandel (for the north-eastern part of Waikato region) and Taupō, on the Volcanic or Central Plateau (for the south-eastern part of the region).

== Demographics ==
Waikato Region covers 23,900.95 km^{2} (9,228.21 sq mi) and had an estimated population of 532,100 as of June 2025, with a population density of 22 people per km^{2}.

Historical population
Year	Pop.	±% p.a.
1991	331,026	—
1996	350,112	+1.13%
2001	357,726	+0.43%
2006	380,823	+1.26%
2013	403,641	+0.83%
2018	458,202	+2.57%
2023	498,771	+1.71%

Waikato Region had a population of 498,771 in the 2023 New Zealand census, an increase of 40,569 people (8.9%) since the 2018 census, and an increase of 95,130 people (23.6%) since the 2013 census. There were 246,723 males, 250,380 females and 1,671 people of other genders in 180,006 dwellings. 2.8% of people identified as LGBTIQ+. The median age was 37.9 years (compared with 38.1 years nationally). There were 100,743 people (20.2%) aged under 15 years, 93,111 (18.7%) aged 15 to 29, 218,808 (43.9%) aged 30 to 64, and 86,109 (17.3%) aged 65 or older.

People could identify as more than one ethnicity. The results were 71.7% European (Pākehā); 25.2% Māori; 5.2% Pasifika; 12.2% Asian; 1.4% Middle Eastern, Latin American and African New Zealanders (MELAA); and 2.3% other, which includes people giving their ethnicity as "New Zealander". English was spoken by 95.9%, Māori language by 6.3%, Samoan by 0.6% and other languages by 12.4%. No language could be spoken by 2.2% (e.g. too young to talk). New Zealand Sign Language was known by 0.5%. The percentage of people born overseas was 21.7, compared with 28.8% nationally.

Religious affiliations were 30.6% Christian, 2.2% Hindu, 1.2% Islam, 1.8% Māori religious beliefs, 0.9% Buddhist, 0.5% New Age, 0.1% Jewish, and 2.2% other religions. People who answered that they had no religion were 53.5%, and 7.4% of people did not answer the census question.

Of those at least 15 years old, 65,295 (16.4%) people had a bachelor's or higher degree, 212,241 (53.3%) had a post-high school certificate or diploma, and 101,277 (25.4%) people exclusively held high school qualifications. The median income was $40,300, compared with $41,500 nationally. 40,746 people (10.2%) earned over $100,000 compared to 12.1% nationally. The employment status of those at least 15 was that 200,928 (50.5%) people were employed full-time, 53,667 (13.5%) were part-time, and 12,165 (3.1%) were unemployed.

=== Cities and towns ===
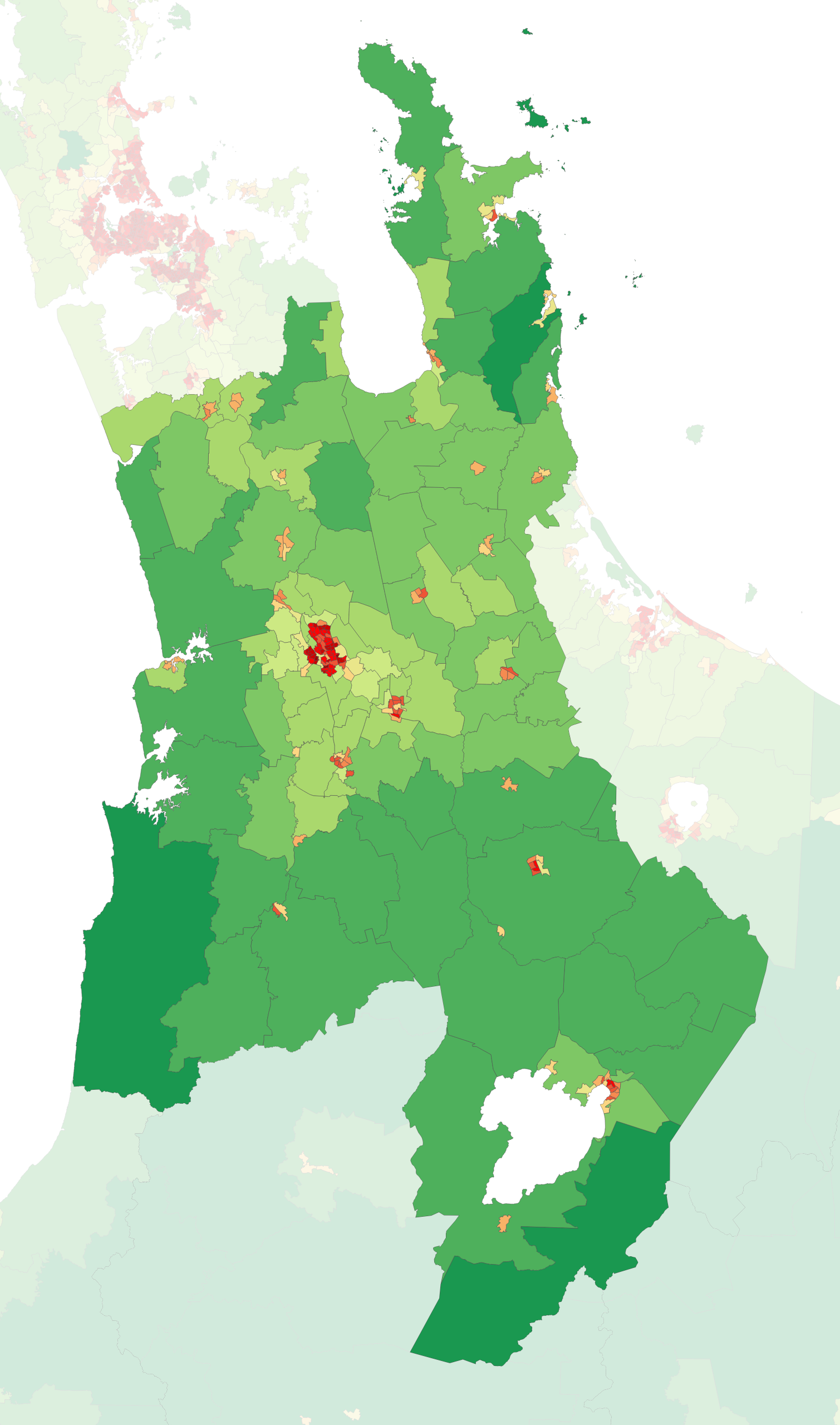
Map of population density in the Waikato region (2023 census)

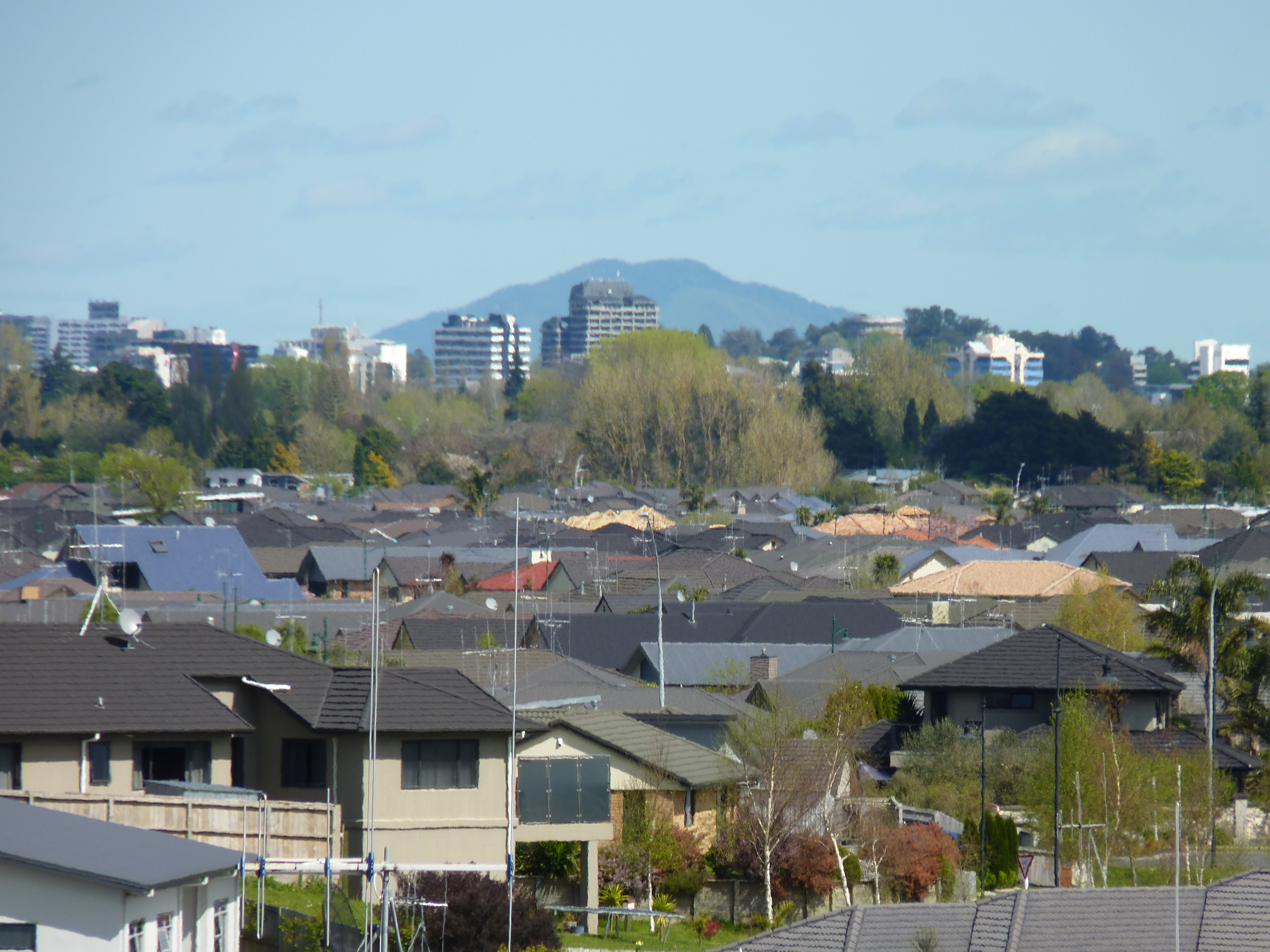
Hamilton, the most populous city in the Waikato region

The most populous city in the Waikato Region is Hamilton, with an urban population of 192,100 (June 2025). It is home to the University of Waikato and the Waikato Institute of Technology (Wintec).

Other major towns in the region are Tokoroa, Te Awamutu, Cambridge and Taupō with respective populations of 14,500, 13,950, 22,700 and 27,000. (These populations include the urban and peri-urban areas). The region also includes the smaller towns of Huntly, Matamata, Morrinsville, Ngāruawāhia, Ōtorohanga, Paeroa, Putāruru, Raglan, Te Aroha, Te Kauwhata, Te Kūiti, Thames, Tīrau, Tuakau, Tūrangi, Whangamatā and Whitianga.

Largest groups of overseas-born residents
Nationality	Population (2018)
England	17,907
India	8,664
Australia	7,314
South Africa	6,936
China	6,582
Philippines	4,974
Fiji	4,176
Netherlands	2,490
Scotland	2,196
United States	1,893

Urban area	Population (June 2025)	% of region
Hamilton	192,100	36.1%
Taupō	27,000	5.1%
Cambridge	22,700	4.3%
Tokoroa	14,500	2.7%
Te Awamutu	13,950	2.6%
Matamata	9,540	1.8%
Morrinsville	9,770	1.8%
Huntly	8,550	1.6%
Ngāruawāhia	8,570	1.6%
Thames	7,230	1.4%
Whitianga	6,140	1.2%
Pōkeno	7,380	1.4%
Tuakau	6,090	1.1%
Waihī	5,850	1.1%
Te Kūiti	4,850	0.9%
Te Aroha	4,730	0.9%
Paeroa	4,600	0.9%
Putāruru	4,560	0.9%
Whangamatā	4,230	0.8%
Raglan	3,910	0.7%
Tūrangi	3,960	0.7%
Kihikihi	3,820	0.7%
Ōtorohanga	3,240	0.6%
Te Kauwhata	3,780	0.7%
Coromandel	1,780	0.3%
Tairua	1,640	0.3%
Ngatea	1,600	0.3%
Pirongia	1,360	0.3%
Pāuanui	1,070	0.2%

== Economy ==
The subnational gross domestic product (GDP) of the Waikato region was estimated at NZ$25.84 billion in the year to March 2019, 8.5% of New Zealand's national GDP. The subnational GDP per capita was estimated at $54,128 in the same period. In the year to March 2018, primary industries contributed $3.14 billion (13.0%) to the regional GDP, goods-producing industries contributed $5.70 billion (23.5%), service industries contributed $13.35 billion (55.0%), and taxes and duties contributed $2.08 billion (8.6%).

Between 2000 and 2004, Waikato economic growth was lower than the national average. But from 2004 to 2007, real gross regional product for the Waikato Region increased by 5 per cent per year compared with 3.2 per cent for the national average. This faster growth can be attributed to rapidly growing dairy and business services industries, facilitated by proximity to the Auckland city, the main international gateway for New Zealand.

=== Agriculture ===
Given the suitable geography and climate, the Waikato economy is strongly based on agriculture, especially dairy. Dairy farming has been the main agricultural activity since the late nineteenth century. Within the Waikato region, small co-operative dairy companies were widespread during the 20th century. Towards the end of the 20th century, frequent mergers of co-operative dairy companies occurred, which ultimately ended in the formation of New Zealand wide dairy co-operative Fonterra in 2001. In 2007, dairy farming and dairy processing combined contributed $2 billion (13%) to GRP, which had risen to $2.4bn by 2014, but only 13,683 (7.6%) of jobs in 2016.

Dairy farms are mainly family owned (2,608 of 4,020 farms in 2016) with owners employing sharemilkers in many cases (1,412 sharemilkers). The size of the average dairy herd in the Waikato has progressively increased. It was about 320 cows in 2012 and in 2016 was about 351 (total Waikato herd 1.41m cows), milked in either a herringbone or automated rotary cowshed so a large herd can be milked in under two hours. The cows are kept on grassland pasture all year due to the mild climate. In the Waikato the original English grasses used by earlier settlers – browntop, fescue and Yorkshire Fog – have been replaced with higher producing Italian ryegrass and nitrogen-fixing white clover. Farmers use a variety of supplementary feeds in winter or during the infrequent summer droughts. Main feeds are hay, grass silage and chopped corn feed. The later is often fed out on a concrete pad to save transportation and wastage by trampling.

=== Manufacturing ===
The manufacturing sector in Waikato contributed $2,688 million in GDP in the year to March 2018, 11.1% of the regional GDP. According to the 2013 New Zealand census, the sector employed 18,519 people, or 9.9% of the region's employed population.

With a large dairy farming industry, the Waikato also has a large dairy processing industry. Fonterra operates dairy processing plants at Te Rapa, Te Awamutu, Hautapu, Morrinsville, Waitoa, Tīrau and Lichfield. Other dairy processing plants include Tatua Dairy Company's plant at Tatuanui, and Open Country Dairy's plant at Horotiu and Waharoa.

The Waikato region has eight major freezing works: AFFCO at Horotiu, Greenlea at Hamilton and Morrinsville, Silver Fern Farms at Te Aroha and Waitoa, Te Kuiti Meat Processors and Universal Beef Packers at Te Kuiti, and Crusader Meats at Benneydale.

The Kinleith Mill south of Tokoroa processes wood from the surrounding forests into pulp and paper.

== History ==
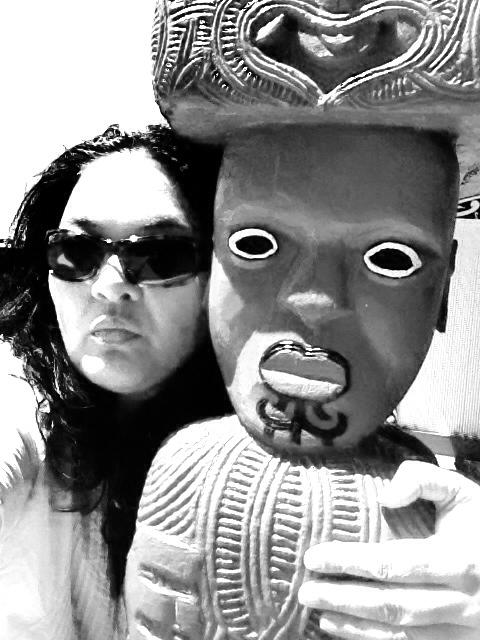
Māori woman with a representation of the Waikato Ancestress "Te Iringa"

Before the arrival of Europeans, the Waikato contained the third most densely populated part of New Zealand, after Northland/Auckland and the Bay of Plenty. The Waikato rohe (area) was inhabited by iwi (tribes) such as those of the Tainui confederation, including Waikato and Ngāti Toa. Between about 1750 and 1842 the area was subject to a large number of invasions by other Māori iwi and hapu confederations and large scale population migrations took place by a number of hapū and iwi. The largest battle ever fought in New Zealand took place near Ōhaupō about 1790–1805, between two competing alliances of hapū. During the latter stages of this volatile period, known as the Musket Wars (1807–1845), conflict led to a migration south to Taranaki and eventually Kapiti Island.

In 1840 44 Waikato chiefs travelled north to the Manukau Heads and Manukau Harbour to sign the Treaty of Waitangi, officially making the Waikato area part of New Zealand. Three Ngāti Maniapoto chiefs signed, as did three Ngāti Haua chiefs but most signatories were Waikato. Chief Te Whero whero did not sign, "probably due to the lack of dignity compared to the Waitangi event". Unusually, the copy signed was in English. Between 1840 and 1860 the CMS missionaries of the Anglican church assisted Waikato Māori in revolutionising their economy in the Kihikihi area by the introduction of such crops as peaches, maize and wheat.

Missionaries brought in millers and helped Māori establish eight flour mills. These flourished until 1857, as they provided flour for the growing Auckland market in the 1850s and for a brief while were exporting to Australia. There were mills at Aotea, Kaitotehe, Karakariki, Kihikihi, Kirikiriroa, Kohanga, Kopatauaki, Mahoe, Mangaharakeke, Mangapapa, Mangarewarewa, Mangatāwhiri, Matamata pā, Maungakawa, Maungatautari, Mohoaonui, Otawhao, Patetere, Rangataiki, Rangiaowhia, Taupō, Te Kopua, Te Rore, Tireke, Tuakau, Waitetuna, Whāingaroa and Whatawhata.

The route used to travel to and from Auckland was by dray to the Puniu stream, along the Waipā River to its junction with the Waikato. Near the Waikato Heads travellers entered the small Awaroa River. During summer it was necessary to push or pull the waka through to the Manukau Harbour at Waiuku. By the 1850s a small bullock track had been established to Auckland via the settlements of Mauku, Drury, Papakura and Ōtāhuhu, or waka could take the sea route across the Manukau to Ihumātao (where Auckland International Airport is now). The main tribe to use this route and the main traders were the Maniapoto tribe. They occupied an area of fertile land south of Te Awamutu at Kihikihi and Rangiaowhia. Maniapoto sold wheat, peaches, potatoes and other food to Auckland and bought back shirts, sugar, tobacco and rum. The boom time ended in 1856–1857 with the end of the Australian gold rush, allowing importing of cheaper food, especially flour, from Australia. Even in the boom time of 1854–55, food grown by Waikato Māori, such as Ngāti Maniapoto, was taken to the Auckland market in very small amounts compared to food from the Waiheke Island -Thames area. In early 1855 Ngāti Maniapoto took only 3 canoes of potatoes to Auckland compared to 279 canoes containing a much wider variety of food from the Thames area. Missionaries had also established schools for Māori. Benjamin and Harriet Ashwell ran a school for 50 Māori girls aged 6–17 at Taupiri in 1853. The girls had been at the school for up to 3 years and could read and write in English and do mental arithmetic.

At the time of the Waikato campaign of 1863 against the rebel Māori King Movement forces, the population was estimated by the government at about 3,500 Māori.

During the late 1850s Maniapoto in particular become disgruntled in their dealings with Pākehā. They complained about the way they were treated in Auckland by traders but their chief complaint was that the government was underpaying them for land they were selling. The average price paid by government was 6d per acre but it was sold to settlers for 10/- per acre. The government argued that it had to pay for surveying and administration costs but to Māori it seemed unfair. Before the elevation of the first Māori king there was a wide range of opinions among influential Māori with some such as Wirimu Tamihana's father advocating supporting the Crown while Te Heuheu of Tūwharetoa advocated all out war against the government. This view was initially unpopular as the king movement hoped to work alongside the crown. Māori were upset at the number of children that had been fathered by Pākehā, who had then disappeared. The children were left to be raised by their mothers with general hapū support. John Gorst, a well-educated government agent, reported significant numbers of half-caste children in the Waikato in the late 1850s. However, in the Ngāti Maniapoto iwi at least 7 Pākehā integrated successfully with the tribe from 1842, marrying Māori women. The best known are William Searancke, who became an important government agent, and Frenchman Louis Hetet, who became a successful trader. Their half-caste children lived with the iwi, and some became leading figures.

What tipped the balance was conflict and criminal activity within the Waikato region. Influential chiefs said the treaty had promised the government would help maintain peace. They asked for government magistrates and courts. The government attempted to fulfil these requests but many of the young men who put themselves forward for the positions simply saw that they had an opportunity to get wealthy at the government's expense. This upset the older chiefs, who wanted the strong Māori leader Te Wherowhero to return from Māngere to his lands at Tamahere (South Hamilton) to rein in the out-of-control young chief magistrates.

The Waikato has a prominent history, particularly regarding relationships between Māori and European in early colonial New Zealand. The Waikato was within the defined boundaries of the colonial provinces of New Ulster (1841–1853) and Auckland (1853–1876) but was principally Māori. During the land wars of the 1860s, the Waikato was the scene of five battles in what is referred to as the Invasion of the Waikato. In retaliation for the help Waikato Māori (mainly Ngāti Maniapoto) gave Taranaki Māori in their conflict over land in the earlier First Taranaki War, and the decision by some Waikato hapū to form a separate kingdom – the King Movement or Kīngitanga – in opposition to the government, the colonial government, with the help of troops brought from Britain and Queenite Māori loyal to the Crown, pushed south from the main settlement of Auckland, fighting against Waikato raiders in Auckland before venturing into the Waikato to attack the combined hapū of the King Movement. During 1863 and 1864 fighting occurred at Pukekohe East, Tītī hill, Burtts Farm, Galloway Redoubt, Kiri Kiri, Martyn's Farm, Patumāhoe, Rhodes Clearing, Williamson's Clearing, Otau, Camerontown, Kakaramea and Wairoa ranges (all Auckland), Meremere, Rangiriri, Ngāruawāhia, Rangiaowhia (southwest of Cambridge), Hairini Ridge and Ōrākau (near Kihikihi), all resulting in defeat for the Kīngitanga forces. Eventually the rebel King Movement forces pulled back to positions in the area to the south of the Punui River in South Waikato, still known as the King Country, after 19 defeats by the British. Rewi's Last Stand, one of New Zealand's first motion pictures, in 1925, portrayed an entertaining, fictionalized version of the Ōrākau siege.

The headquarters of the Māori King Movement are now at Tūrangawaewae Marae at Ngāruawāhia.

After the end of the war and the withdrawal of British and Australian troops, the region experienced a long period of economic recession after 1866. Most Māori had moved to the King Country and European settlers were more attracted to the South Island with its large gold discovery in Otago and the more easily farmed Canterbury Plains. The Waikato had poor land access and was not suitable for sheep farming which dominated livestock production in New Zealand until the 1890s invention of refrigeration. Dairying and the completion of the main trunk railway line at the turn of the century lead to a small, steady increase in population. After 1900, dairy production in the Waikato continued to grow, exporting butter and cheese mainly to Britain.

=== Local government history ===
Following major floods in 1907, a Waikato River Board was formed in 1911. However, it was reported as ineffective in 1921 and ceased to operate, though the need for a replacement was considered in 1933.

Hauraki Catchment Board was set up in 1946.

Major floods also occurred in 1953 and 1956. Waikato Valley Authority was established by the Waikato Valley Authority Act on 26 October 1956. The Water and Soil Conservation Act 1967 extended it to become a Catchment/Regional Water Board. The Ministry of Works and Development Abolition Act 1988, left WVA with that work and it became the Waikato Catchment Board.

The Waikato United Council, was formulated under the Local Government Act 1974, but due to objections excluded Thames/Coromandel district, though otherwise covered the present extent of the region. It was set up under the Town and Country Planning Act 1977 and the Waikato Region Constitution Order 1980. WUC covered Hamilton City, Huntly, Ngāruawāhia, Cambridge, Te Awamutu, Matamata, Putāruru and Tokoroa boroughs, Matamata, Raglan, Waikato, and Waipā counties, Ōtorohanga and Waitomo districts. It took over the Hamilton Regional Planning Authority and mainly dealt with regional planning and civil defence. By 1989, WUC had committees for regional planning, civil defence, regional government, and the Waikato Regional Development Board. From 1987 it also included Thames-Coromandel District, Great Barrier Island, Hauraki Plains, Ohinemuri and Piako counties, and Morrinsville, Paeroa, Te Aroha and Waihī boroughs.

On 1 November 1989, Waikato Regional Council was established by the Local Government (Waikato Region) Reorganisation Order 1989. from 40 former authorities:- 2 catchment boards (Hauraki and Waikato), 3 united councils (Waikato, Thames Valley and part of Tongariro), 12 noxious plants authorities, 11 pest destruction boards and 12 drainage boards. The Land Transport Act 1998 added transport to WRC's responsibilities. From 1 November 2010 Environment Waikato took over the southern parts of Franklin District.

== Politics ==
In the 2010 local government elections, the Waikato Region had the country's lowest rate of returned votes. Since then the percentage turnout has declined further.

Council	2010	2013	2016	2019	2022	2025
Taupō District	54.8	48.5	50.2	52.2	52.5	56.1
Waitomo District	49.0	43.6	38.4	52.7	44.0	46.1
Rotorua District	43.4	43.8	45.9	45.2	47.9	43.5
Thames-Coromandel District	43.8	37.8	38.0	40.3	52.1	51.6
Hauraki District	42.8	40.4	44.2	48.8	40.6	41.9
Matamata-Piako District	42.1	44.8	24.1	51.9	43.4	47.5
South Waikato District	39.1	41.5	44.4	36.6	43.9	46.1
Waipā District	41.8	39.6	38.7	35.7	40.4	41.9
Ōtorohanga District	36.4	50.6	25.1	45.1	46.9	52.6
Hamilton City	37.8	38.3	33.6	39.4	29.4	33.0
Waikato District	34.3	31.6	30.6	34.4	32.2	34.8
National voter turnout %	49.0	41.3	42.0	41.7	41.0	40.0
Waikato Region	57.2	39.2	44	44.1	38.7	41.2

== People ==
The people of the Waikato use the nickname Mooloo to apply to themselves or to their region, particularly in relation to sporting endeavours. The word was likely first applied to the Waikato provincial rugby team. Its origin is related to the mascot of a pantomime-like milking cow used in parades, public events and sports matches — particularly rugby, reflecting the importance of the dairy industry to the region. Waikato hosts the Chiefs Super Rugby team and Waikato Mitre 10 Cup rugby team at Waikato Stadium and the Northern Districts Knights in domestic cricket at Seddon Park, both in Hamilton.

=== Notable people ===
==== Arts ====
- The Datsuns — rock band
- Tim and Neil Finn — songwriters and musicians (Split Enz, Crowded House)
- Rob Hamill — champion rower and author.
- Rangimarie Hetet — of Oparure Marae. Died aged 103 years; regarded as living treasure of Māori handcrafts, with honorary degrees.
- Kimbra — notable New Zealand singer-songwriter/guitarist
- Dame Malvina Major — acclaimed international singer
- Frank Sargeson — celebrated NZ writer.
- Maurice Shadbolt — celebrated New Zealand writer
- Jools and Lynda Topp — comedy duo

==== Māoridom ====
- Huiatahi Barrett — tribal leader
- Te Puea Hērangi — Māori princess and leader
- Tūheitia Paki — Māori King 2006–2024
- Eva Rickard — of Tainui descent; leader and defender of Māori land rights
- Te Atairangikaahu — Māori Queen 1966–2006
- Te Rauparaha — Māori chieftain and warrior
- Wiremu Tamihana Tarapipipi Te Waharoa — Māori King kingmaker

==== Military ====
- Roy Calvert — WWII pilot

==== Politics ====
- Jacinda Ardern — former Prime Minister of New Zealand
- Jim Bolger — former Prime Minister of New Zealand
- Helen Clark — former Prime Minister of New Zealand
- Hilda Ross — humanitarian, first woman elected to the Hamilton Borough Council, MP
- Te Hapimana Tauke — tribal leader, mission teacher and historian
- Dame Catherine Tizard (née Mclean) — former Mayor of Auckland and first woman Governor-General of New Zealand

==== Sports ====
- Don Clarke — rugby international
- Anjali Mulari — New Zealand ice and inline hockey player
- Tawera Nikau — rugby league footballer and sports broadcaster
- Simon Poelman — New Zealand decathlete
- Morgan Harper NRL player
