= Graham Botting =

New Zealand cricketer and hockey player

Personal information
- Full name: Graham Stuart Botting
- Born: 27 June 1915; Dunedin, Otago, New Zealand
- Died: 7 March 2007 (aged 91); Tūrangi, Waikato, New Zealand
- Batting: Right-handed
- Role: Wicket-keeper

Domestic team information
- Years: Team
- 1950/51–1952/53: Central Districts
- 1953/54: Otago
- FC debut: 27 January 1949 New Zealand XI v The Rest
- Last FC: 13 January 1954 Otago v Central Districts

Career statistics
Competition	First-class
Matches	16
Runs scored	164
Batting average	8.20
100s/50s	0/0
Top score	27*
Catches/stumpings	24/14
- Source: Cricinfo, 6 April 2007

Graham Stuart Botting (27 June 1915 – 7 March 2007) was a New Zealand cricketer and hockey player. He was born at Dunedin in 1915 and was educated at Otago Boys High School.

Botting was a wicket-keeper who played in the Plunket Shield for Central Districts from 1950–51 to 1952–53 and Otago in 1953–54. He made his first-class debut in January 1949, playing for a New Zealand XI in a trial match ahead of the selection of the New Zealand Test side. He did not play representative cricket for two more seasons, making his Central Districts debut in December 1950 against Wellington at the Basin Reserve. He also played for Nelson in the Hawke Cup from 1945–46 to 1952–53. He played 16 first-class matches, 12 of which were for Central Districts and three for Otago. Described as "a capable wicketkeeper with few pretensions with the bat", he scored a total of 164 runs and made 38 dismissals.

While playing hockey for Otago, Botting represented New Zealand against the visiting Indian team in 1938.

A schoolteacher, Botting taught at Nelson College. He died at Tūrangi in 2007 aged 91. An obituary was published in the 2007 New Zealand Cricket Almanack.
