= Louisa Elizabeth Livingston =

New Zealand artist

- Born: 1839
- Died: 31 December 1883 (aged 44)

Louisa Elizabeth Livingston (née Caldwell, 1839 – 31 December 1883) was a British-born New Zealand artist.

== Biography ==
Born at Hathern in England, Livingston emigrated to New Zealand in the mid-1800s.

On 6 October 1870 she married New Zealand soldier James Livingston in Wellington, and they had three sons and one daughter. They lived in Whanganui until 1873, where James worked in the Land Office and as a foreman on the construction of the Whanganui bridge. In around 1874 they moved to the Pātea district where in 1868 James had served as a sergeant in the Patea Field Force, troops formed to oppose Tītokowaru.

Livingston died on 31 December 1883, aged 45.
