= Huiatahi Barrett =

Huiatahi Barrett (c.1874 – 27 October 1952) was a New Zealand tribal leader. Of Māori descent, he identified with the Ngāti Maniapoto iwi. He was born in Waiharakeke, Waikato, New Zealand on c.1874.
