= Te Hāpimana Taukē =

New Zealand tribal leader and mission teacher

Te Hāpimana Taukē (c. 1810 – 2 June 1915) was a notable New Zealand tribal leader, mission teacher and historian. Of Māori descent, he identified with the Ngāruahine and Ngāti Ruanui iwi. He was born in the Waikato, in about 1810.
