= Jimmy James (tracker, died 1945) =

20th-century Aboriginal Australian tracker

Jimmy James (died 24 December 1945 in Barmera) was an Aboriginal Australian who was best known as an Aboriginal tracker who helped the police track criminals and lost persons.

== Background ==
During the 1920s, James was a police tracker. He then left to live in his resort, Swan Reach. He helped the police in the Monash murder of 1938. He also found a little girl who had been lost for days in the Waikerie district.

His last tracking was to find Mr Breeze, who was lost in the Renmark surroundings, during which James caught tuberculosis. He died in the Lady Weigall Hospital in Barmera on 24 December 1945. He was buried in the Barmera Cemetery on 25 December 1945.

Sergeant Ward of Barmera described James as a "black man with a white heart".

== Family ==
One of his unofficially adopted daughters, Lilian Disher, married another tracker named Jimmy James in 1947.
