= Robert Hurst (nuclear chemist) =

New Zealand–British scientist (1915–1996)

Robert Hurst CBE GM
- Born: 3 January 1915; Nelson, New Zealand
- Died: 16 May 1996 (aged 81); Poole, Dorset, England
- Education: University of Cambridge
- Scientific career
- Fields: Physical chemistry; nuclear science
- Workplaces: Atomic Energy Research Establishment; Atomic Energy Authority; Nuclear Power Development Establishment; British Ship Research Association
- Thesis: The kinetics of some reactions in solution (1949)

Robert Hurst CBE GM (3 January 1915 – 16 May 1996) was a New Zealand-born scientist. He was the first director of the experimental fast-breeder reactor complex at Dounreay, and later the director of the British Ship Research Association. During World War II, he worked in bomb disposal and mine detection, and was awarded the George Medal for his work as part of the team that defused the first V-1 flying bomb found intact in Britain.

== Early life ==
Hurst was born in Nelson, New Zealand, in 1915, the son of Percy Cecil Hurst, a commercial traveller, and his wife Margery Whitwell. He attended Nelson College from 1927 to 1932, and then was a student at Canterbury University College in Christchurch, from where he graduated with a Master of Science degree in physical chemistry in 1939. While at Canterbury, Hurst was a member of a student group assisting European Jews to escape the Nazis.

Following his graduation, Hurst was en route to the United Kingdom by ship to undertake doctoral studies at Emmanuel College, Cambridge, working his passage as a radio operator, when World War II broke out.

== War service ==
In 1940, after completing the first year of his PhD studies, Hurst volunteered as a civilian experimental scientist with the Ministry of Supply, undertaking bomb disposal and mine detection duties. In 1944, he was part of the team, led by John Pilkington Hudson, that defused the first V-1 flying bomb found intact in Britain. It took the team a week of painstaking work to successfully complete the task, made more difficult by toxic fumes from the explosive and ongoing bombing raids. As a result, Hurst was awarded the George Medal: his citation noted his "sustained courage when engaged in hazardous operations".

At the end of the war, Hurst saw service in Berlin, assisting with defusing unexploded Allied bombs.

== Scientific career ==
Hurst returned to Cambridge after the war to complete his PhD in physical chemistry. In 1948, he joined the Atomic Energy Research Establishment at Harwell, working first on the chemistry of plutonium, before heading a team that investigated the potential of different types of nuclear reactors. In 1957, he was appointed chief chemist at the Atomic Energy Authority Industrial Research and Development branch at Risley, Cheshire, and in 1958 he was named as the first director of the Dounreay experimental fast-breeder reactor complex.

In 1963, Hurst left Dounreay to take up the directorship of the British Ship Research Association.

In the 1973 Queen's Birthday Honours, Hurst was appointed a Commander of the Order of the British Empire.

== Retirement and death ==
Hurst retired to Poole, Dorset, in 1976, where he did voluntary work with the Royal National Lifeboat Institution. He died in 1996 following his third heart attack.
