= Jimmy James (tracker, died 1991) =

Aboriginal Australian tracker (1913–1991)

Jimmy James OAM (1913–1991) was an Aboriginal Australian and member of the Pitjantjatjara people, who was best known as an Aboriginal tracker who helped South Australian Police in tracking criminals over a forty-year period.

== Background ==
James was born near Ernabella (now Pukatja) in northern South Australia, to parents Warlawurru (Eagle-Hawk) and Kaarnka (Black Crow). His death certificate recorded his date of birth as 7 March 1910, although he also sometimes claimed to be born in 1913. He spent his late childhood at the Ooldea Mission.

In 1945, he was restrained while trying to leave his workplace with four coworkers for the Port Pirie police station. The grievance related to eight months of unpaid wages from their employer - the Mount Dare station. The manager was arrested and later found guilty of assault and maltreatment of Aboriginal people.

In January 1946, James and the other workers moved to the South Australian Riverland, where he assisted in the establishment of the new Gerard Mission.

== Tracking ==
In 1948, James began his career as a tracker for police and landowners, and gained much of his reputation tracking criminals (including arsonists, poachers and escapees) and lost persons. The Sundown murders in 1957 and Pine Valley murder in 1958 were his most publicised cases.

In 1966, he found nine-year-old Wendy Pfeiffer after she was abducted near Mylor, stabbed, and left for dead in the woods. He led this man-hunt alongside Daniel Moodoo. In January 2019, SBS launched an interactive website that recounts the story of the Pfeiffer case.

In 1982, he found the dangerous escapee James Beauregard-Smith.

== Death ==
In 1987, he suffered several strokes that crippled him. He died on 27 October 1991. He is buried with his family in the Gerard Reserve Cemetery at the Gerard Mission.

After his death, a granite memorial was erected in Berri, South Australia.

== Awards ==
- 1984: Medal of the Order of Australia
- 1983: South Australian Aboriginal Person of the Year
- Gold medallion given by the family of Wendy Pfeiffer

== Personal life ==
James married Lilian Disher on 22 February 1947 at the Gerard Mission, giving his age as 21. Disher was the unofficial adopted daughter of Jimmy James, another tracker from whom James took his "white" name. They had four children but James outlived all of them due to issues such as illness and alcoholism.

== Sources ==
- Holmes, Robert (2003). "Jimmy James, O.A.M. (c. 1913–1991): Aboriginal police tracker". In Healey, John (ed.). S.A.'s Greats: The men and women of the North Terrace plaques. Kent Town, South Australia: Historical Society of South Australia. ISBN 0-9579430-0-8.
