= Fred Lucas (aviator) =

New Zealand military and commercial aviator

Frederick John "Popeye" Lucas (18 August 1915 – 4 October 1993) was a New Zealand World War II and commercial aviator, farmer and tourist operator.

== Early life ==
He was born in Dunedin, New Zealand on 18 August 1915, the second child of Charles Frederick Lucas, a farmer, and Ethel Jean Smith. After one year of Otago Boys' High School, he went to work on the family farm. On 21 July 1935, he obtained his pilot's license.

== Military career ==
Turned down by the Royal New Zealand Air Force due to his lack of education, he worked his way to England and joined the Royal Air Force (RAF) in December 1936. After training, he was posted to No. 10 Squadron RAF in August 1937. His resemblance to the cartoon character and a party trick (swiveling his dentures in his mouth) earned him the nickname "Popeye". He transferred to the Royal New Zealand Air Force to help deliver Wellington I bombers to New Zealand. Afterward, the airplanes and their crews were seconded to the RAF as No. 10 Squadron RAF, based at Feltwell, East Anglia, England. Lucas completed a tour of 30 missions over Germany, but determined to be part of the squadron's first raid on Berlin, he signed up for a second tour of duty. The mission – his 37th – took place on 23 September 1940. In May 1941, he was promoted to squadron leader.

Following the death of his wife Joan on 15 December 1941, Lucas was posted back to New Zealand in March 1942. was awarded a bar to his Distinguished Flying Cross in April. He commanded No. 1 General Reconnaissance Squadron, based at Whenuapai air base and later helped form No. 40 (Transport) Squadron. He pioneered air supply routes for the New Zealand military in the Pacific. He was discharged in October 1945 as a wing commander.

== Post-war ==
On 20 April 1943, he had married Loraine (Lorie) Jean Flansburgh-Washbourne. The couple became farmers at Pukepito, South Otago.

However, Lucas could not get flying out of his blood, so he and fellow pilot Bill Hewett formed a freight, scenic and charter company at Queenstown in September 1947. They finally obtained a government license in 1950 to run a twice-weekly, later daily, passenger service between Queenstown and Dunedin. The company expanded and offered scenic flights as well. In 1960, however, the partners did not get along, and Lucas left the company.

In 1953, Lucas was awarded the Queen Elizabeth II Coronation Medal.

Lucas next embarked on sheep farming and a tourism venture at Cecil Peak station. Farming was not a great success, but the tourism business was, with 13,000 visitors during the 1964–65 summer season. In 1975, the couple sold their business and farmed in Lower Moutere for ten years.

Fred Lucas died on 4 October 1993 at Motueka.
