= Muriel Boswell =

New Zealand netball player

Personal information
- Full name: Muriel Frances Boswell (Née: Howe)
- Born: 31 October 1915 Petone, New Zealand
- Died: 5 November 2003 (aged 88) Whanganui, New Zealand
- Height: 1.72 m (5 ft 8 in)
- School: Hutt Valley High School

Netball career
- Playing position: C
Years	National team	Caps
1938	New Zealand	1

Muriel Frances Boswell (née Howe; 31 October 1915 – 5 November 2003) was a New Zealand netball player. She was a member of the New Zealand team in their first Test match, in 1938 against Australia.

== Early life ==
Born Muriel Frances Howe in Petone on 31 October 1915, Boswell was the daughter of Archibald Charles and Margaret Howe. She was educated at Petone West School, where she was dux in 1928, and Hutt Valley High School, where she was prominent in sports including tennis and swimming.

== Netball career ==
=== Domestic ===
Howe first played representative netball for Wellington as a forward in 1933, but in 1936 and 1937 she was selected at centre. In 1938, she was described as being "brilliant in quick interception and ever ready to make openings for her defence".

=== International ===
In 1938, Howe was selected for the New Zealand national netball team that travelled to Australia and competed in the Australian interstate tournament in Melbourne. At times, the New Zealand team struggled as the matches were played on grass courts under Australian rules, which differed from those used in New Zealand at the time. After missing the first two games of the tournament, Howe appeared in an exhibition match played under New Zealand rules, in which the New Zealand team beat Victoria 19–5. Howe also played in New Zealand's remaining matches, being defeated by South Australia 14–47 and Tasmania 17–32, before overcoming New South Wales 21–18.

Howe played in the single Test match, the first played between New Zealand and Australia, in Melbourne on 20 August 1938, with New Zealand losing 11–40. The match was played under Australian rules.

== Later life and death ==
In 1939, as part of the Hutt Valley centennial celebrations, Howe was named as the sports queen in the Hutt Valley Queen Carnival.

On 17 June 1944, Howe married David John Boswell at the Free Wesleyan Church in Nuku'alofa, Tonga. The couple lived for many years in Hawke's Bay, where Dave Boswell was general manager of the Central Hawke's Bay Electric Power Board from 1945 to 1964, and had four children.

Muriel Boswell died in Whanganui on 5 November 2003, aged 88. Her husband, Dave Boswell, died in 2015.
