= Browntop =

Browntop is a common name for several grasses and may refer to:

- Agrostis capillaris, or browntop bent
- Brachiaria ramosa, or browntop millet
- Microstegium
