= James Livingston (soldier) =

New Zealand soldier, community leader

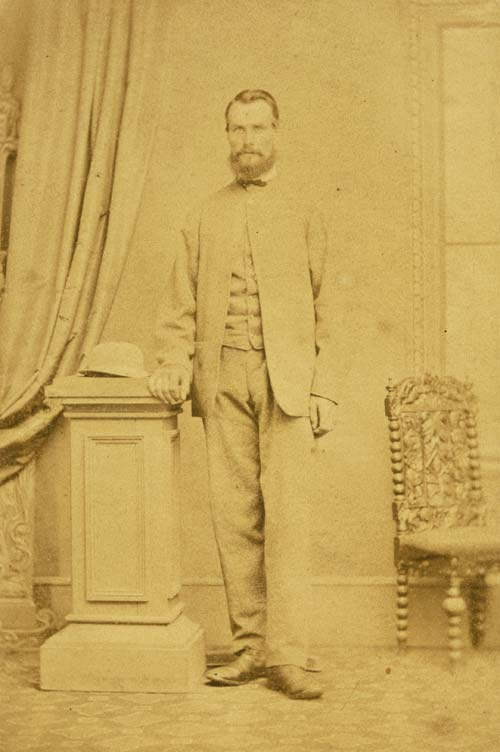
James Livingston, 1860s

James Livingston (7 February 1840 – 7 May 1915) was a New Zealand soldier and community leader. He was born on 7 February 1840. In 1870 he married English-born artist Louisa Elizabeth Livingston (née Caldwell) in Wellington, and they together had three sons and one daughter.
