= Wiremu Kerei Nikora =

New Zealand politician (1853–1915)

- Born: 1853
- Died: 15 July 1915 (aged 61–62)
- Occupation: Politician

Wiremu Kerei Nikora (William Grey Nicholls) (1853 – 15 July 1915) a Māori politician from Paeroa, New Zealand. Son of William Nicholls from Cornwall, UK and Hera Te Whakaawa from Matakana Island (Ngai Te Rangi, Ngati Tauaiti). Nikora was appointed a member of the New Zealand Legislative Council on 26 June 1913, and was a member until he died in 1915. Nikora was called to the Upper House in 1913. He owned a very considerable amount of property at Paeroa and at Matamata. He married Rihitoto Mataia, of Paeroa. Nikora was the first chairman of the Ohinemuri County Council, and held many prominent positions connected with local bodies throughout the district
