= John Scandrett =

New Zealand cricketer (1915–2006)

Jack Scandrett
Personal information
- Full name: John Carruthers Scandrett
- Born: 22 February 1915; Invercargill, Southland, New Zealand
- Died: 29 August 2006 (aged 91); Nelson, New Zealand
- Batting: Left-handed
- Bowling: Right-arm off break

Domestic team information
- Years: Team
- 1934/35–1946/47: Southland
- 1935/36–1943/44: Otago
- Source: CricInfo, 23 May 2016

John Carruthers Scandrett (22 February 1915 – 29 August 2006) was a New Zealand cricketer. He played four first-class matches for Otago between the 1935–36 and 1943–44 seasons.

Scandrett was born at Invercargill in Southland in 1915 and educated at Southland Boys' High School in the city. He played cricket for Southland between 1934–36 and 1946–47, including in the Hawke Cup, before making his first-class debut for Otago against Auckland in December 1935. After scoring 13 runs on debut, he played again for the side later in the season and made another Plunket Shield appearance for Otago during the following season. His final first-class appearance was a wartime match against Canterbury in December 1943.

Scandrett died at Nelson in 2006. he was aged 91. An obituary was published in the 2007 New Zealand Cricket Almanack.
