= Ethel Divers =

New Zealand netball player

Personal information
- Full name: Ethel Isabella Divers (Née: Howard)
- Born: 4 September 1915
- Died: 28 May 2014 (aged 98)
- Height: 1.65 m (5 ft 5 in)

Netball career
- Playing positions: GS, GA
Years	National team	Caps
1938	New Zealand	1

Ethel Isabella Divers (formerly Helean, née Howard; 4 September 1915 – 28 May 2014) was a New Zealand netball player. She was a member of the New Zealand team in their first Test match, in 1938 against Australia.

== Early life ==
Divers was born Ethel Isabella Howard on 4 September 1915. She was educated at Waitaki Girls' High School in Oamaru, where she represented the school in tennis.

== Netball career ==
=== Domestic ===
Howard played representative netball for Otago in 1936 and 1937, and was named in the South Island team. In 1937, she also played for Wellington, where she was training as a dental nurse, and gained North Island honours. In 1938, she was described as a "fast elusive forward, and an accurate shot".

=== International ===
In 1936, Howard was first selected to tour Australia with a New Zealand national team the following season, but the tour did not proceed. In 1938, she was once again selected for the New Zealand netball team, when a national side travelled to Australia and competed in the Australian interstate tournament in Melbourne. At times, the New Zealand team struggled as the matches were played on grass courts under Australian rules, which differed from those used in New Zealand at the time. Howard played in an exhibition match played under New Zealand rules, in which the New Zealand team beat Victoria 19–5.

Howard played in the single Test match, the first played between New Zealand and Australia, in Melbourne on 20 August 1938. New Zealand were defeated 11–40. The match was played under Australian rules.

== Later life ==
Howard worked as a school dental nurse. On 14 February 1944, she married William Brindley Helean at St Matthew's Church in Dunedin. William Helean served as a colonial administrator and public servant in East Africa.

Ethel Helean later remarried. She died in Dunedin on 28 May 2014, aged 98.
