= Terence Vaughan =

Terence Vaughan OBE (26 May 1915 – 26 April 1996) was a notable New Zealand pianist, wartime entertainment director, conductor, composer and performing arts administrator. He was born in Whangārei, Northland, New Zealand in 1915.
