= Air Defence Cadet Corps =

Air Defence Cadet Corps (ADCC)
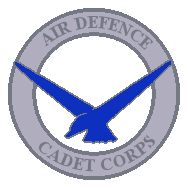
- Corps Badge
- Active: 1938–1941
- Disbanded: 1941, reformed into the Air Training Corps
- Country: United Kingdom
- Type: Volunteer Youth Organisation of the RAF
- Role: Training of young people for aviation related military roles.

Commanders
- Former commander: Air Commodore J A Chamier

The Air Defence Cadet Corps was a volunteer youth organisation in the United Kingdom, preparing young people for military aviation. Founded in 1938, it was replaced in 1941 by the Air Training Corps.

== Establishment ==
In January 1938, Air Commodore Chamier's plan to form an Air Defence Cadet Corps (ADCC) came to fruition. His idea was to attract and train young men who had an interest in aviation, from all over the country. He planned to set up squadrons of young cadets in as many towns and cities as possible, and ask local people to organise and run them.

Air Commodore Chamier's idea seemed to capture the mood of the British people at the time. In their eagerness to help the nation in preparation for war, young men rushed to join the Corps in their thousands. The cadets were asked to pay a weekly subscription of 3d (around 77.5p in 2016).

== Aim ==
Each squadron's aim was to prepare cadets for joining the RAF or the Fleet Air Arm. They tried to give the cadets as much Service and aviation background as possible as well as giving instruction in drill, discipline, how to wear the uniform and how to behave on RAF stations. The training the cadets received also meant development of personal physical fitness. PT, games and athletics, especially cross country running and long route marches, soon became standard squadron activities. Cadets were also encouraged to take part in activities such as shooting, camping and, of course, flying. By the end of 1938 the activities of the ADCC were severely restricted because of the approach of World War II.

== Members ==
Many ADCC instructors and squadron officers were called up into regular service, buildings were commandeered by either the Service or by local government for war work, and cadets went to work on RAF stations. Cadets were used to carry messages, they helped with clerical duties, in providing extra muscle in handling aircraft and in the movement of stores and equipment. They filled thousands of sandbags and loaded miles of belts of ammunition.

Throughout the early stages of war, the government received good reports as to the quality of cadets entering the RAF and Fleet Air Arm. It was so impressed that it asked the ADCC to begin training young men who were waiting to be called into service. The ADCC willingly took on this task and in a very short space of time produced thousands of well qualified individuals who went on to pass quickly through basic training.

== Establishment of the ATC ==
Towards the end of 1940, the government realised the value of the work done by the ADCC and agreed to take over its control. This meant a number of changes to the corps, and brought about the birth of a new organisation, called the Air Training Corps. So on 5 February 1941 the Air Training Corps (ATC) was officially established, with King George VI agreeing to be the Air Commodore-in-Chief, and issuing a Royal Warrant setting out the Corps' aims.

== Ranks ==
The ranks for cadets were the same as NCO ranks of the RAF, but with the inclusion of Lance Corporal as a rank, the rank of Flight Sergeant featuring an Air League Bird in a circle in place of a crown, and the initial rank insignia for Cadet Warrant Officer being the Air League Bird in a laurel wreath.

Cadet ranks and insignia

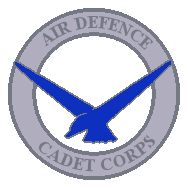
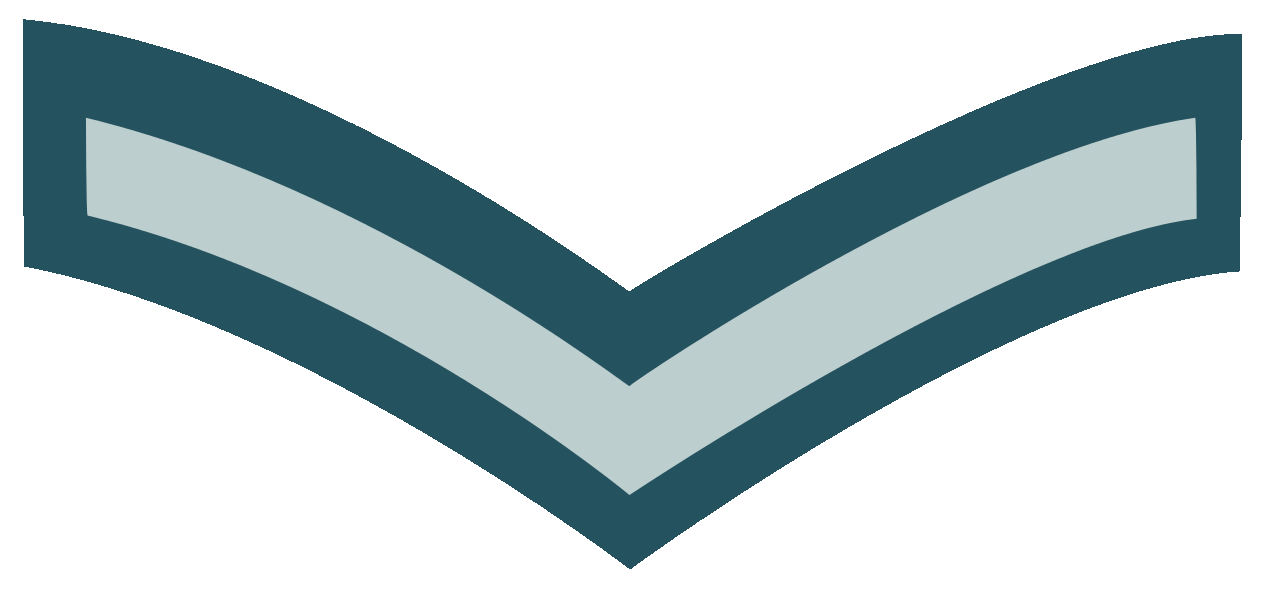
Air Defence Cadet Corps	1939-1941 1941
Air Defence Cadet Corps	Cadet warrant officer	Cadet flight sergeant	Cadet sergeant	Cadet corporal	Cadet lance corporal	Cadet
Air Defence Cadet Corps	CDTWO	CDTFSGT	CDTSGT	CDTCPL	CDTLCPL	CDT
