= Gilbert Allen McKenzie =

New Zealand artist and entertainer

Gilbert Allen McKenzie (27 May 1915 – 26 May 1941) was a New Zealand disabled artist and entertainer. He was born in Invercargill, Southland, New Zealand on 27 May 1915 and died on 26 May 1941, a day before his 26th birthday.
