= Ann Alabaster =

Ann O'Connor Alabaster
- Born: 15 February 1842; Oxford, England
- Died: 25 February 1915 (aged 73); Christchurch, New Zealand
- Occupation: Teacher
- Known for: Foundation of Lincoln Cottage Preparatory School
- Spouse: Charles Alabaster (married 1858-1865) Canon Francis Knowles (married 1891)
- Children: 2

Ann O’Connor Alabaster (née Warner, 15 February 1842 – 25 February 1915) was a New Zealand teacher and businesswoman. She was the founder of the prestigious boys' school Lincoln Cottage Preparatory School in Christchurch.

== Early life ==
Alabaster was born in Oxford, Oxfordshire, England, to Sarah Lyne and her husband Robert Warner, a shoemaker. As a teen, she taught at the parish school of St Ebbe, Oxford. She met curate of St Ebbe and fellow teacher Charles Alabaster (b. 1832/1833, d. 1865) there and married the 25-year-old in 1858, herself aged sixteen. Charles was afflicted with tuberculosis, and was told that a long sea voyage would cure him, leading the two to emigrate to New Zealand, arriving in Lyttelton on the Strathallan in January 1859. The two ran a small school aboard the ship. In 1860 she gave birth to a son, Austin Henry Alabaster. She had a second son, John Chaloner Alabaster, the following year.

== Career ==
From 1859 to 1861, Alabaster worked in the house and her husband worked as a pastor. In 1861, her husband became ill and was forced to retire. The need for income, Alabaster's teaching experience and the couple's strong support for denominational education led to Alabaster opening Lincoln Cottage Preparatory School in 1862.

The school was named after Lincoln Cottage at Oxford University, where Charles Alabaster had studied. It was open to boys aged 5–10, taught both day students and boarders, and was significantly more expensive than public schools at the time. Examinations were conducted by the Anglican Clergy. The school taught a remarkably wide range of subjects for its time. It was located in Cranmer Square, Christchurch, and prepared boys to enter Christ's College. Alabaster managed the school herself until her retirement in 1882.

In 1865, Charles Alabaster died, and Alabaster continued to run the school. Former headmaster of Christ's College, Dean Henry Jacobs, described the school in 1869 as "the best means of training" for entry to the college. Notable alumni of Lincoln Cottage Preparatory School include William Pember Reeves. Around 1880, Alabaster no longer needed the extra income to support her sons, and began planning to retire. Lincoln Cottage Preparatory School closed in 1882.

== Retirement ==
After retiring, she took in lady boarders to earn an income, and then remarried in 1891. Canon Frances Knowles, her new husband, was an Anglican clergyman. Alabaster loved music, and sang in concerts in Christchurch after retiring. She died in Christchurch on 25 February 1915.
