= Anthony Chamier =

English official, financier and politician

Anthony Chamier (6 October 1725 – 12 October 1780) was an English official, financier and politician who sat in the House of Commons from 1778 to 1780. He was known also as a friend of Samuel Johnson.

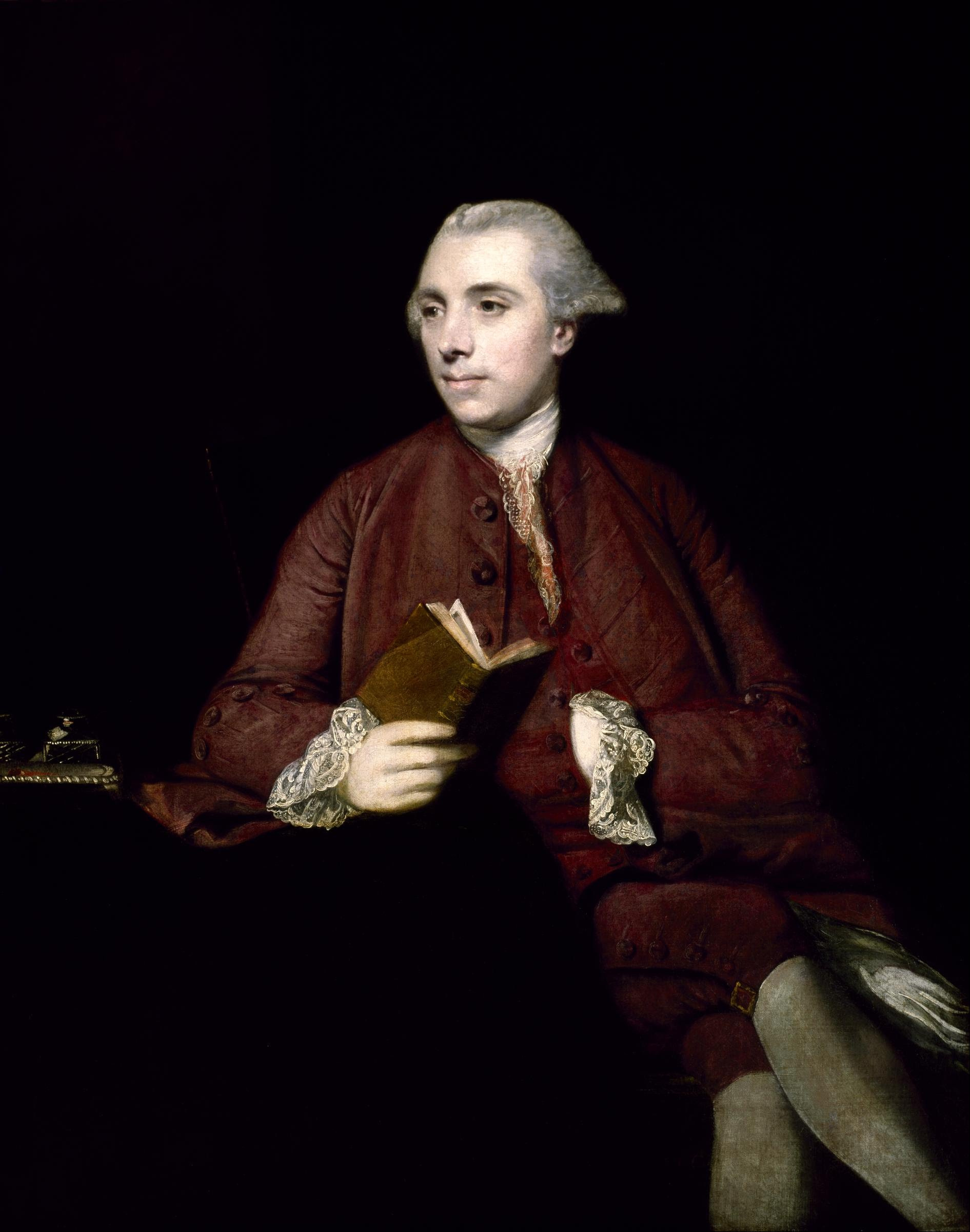
Anthony Chamier, 1767 portrait by Sir Joshua Reynolds

== Life ==
From a Huguenot background, Chamier was born on 6 October 1725, and baptised in the Walloon chapel, Threadneedle Street, London, on 19 October, his parents being Daniel Chamier and Susanne de la Mejanelle. Early in life he was a broker on the Stock Exchange, as his enemies in later years did not allow him to forget.

Through his wife's connection Chamier obtained a place in the public service; and in January 1772 was promoted by Lord Barrington to the post of deputy secretary at war. Philip Francis brutally criticised the appointment.

Chamier was created under-secretary of state for the southern department in 1775, and on 10 June 1778 was elected Member of Parliament for Tamworth. On 11 September 1780, a month and a day before his death, he was re-elected there. He died in Savile Row, London, on 12 October 1780, and was buried at St James's, Piccadilly.

== Associations ==
Chamier was an original member in 1764 of the Literary Club, and Samuel Johnson, when drawing up his scheme of a university at St Andrews, assigned to him the chair of "commercial politics". His country house was at Streatham; Johnson used to visit there, for example on his seventieth birthday, and asked Chamier for favours on behalf of acquaintances.

Chamier was elected a fellow of the Royal Society in 1767. He sat for Sir Joshua Reynolds three times (December 1762, January 1767, and November 1777), and two houses which Reynolds particularly liked were those of the Hornecks and Chamier.

== Family ==
Anthony Chamier was a descendant of the huguenot minister and Theologian Daniel Chamier (1564–1621).

Chamier married Dorothy, daughter and coheiress of Robert Wilson, merchant of St Mary Axe, London. Her sister married Thomas Bradshaw, who became private secretary to the Duke of Grafton, and joint secretary of the treasury in the Chatham and Grafton administrations.

Chamier left no issue, and his property passed by will to his nephew, John Ezechiel Deschamps (later Chamier), with a testamentary injunction to take the name and arms of the Chamier family. This is where the double-barreled surname 'Deschamps Chamier' originates from.

== Notes ==
Attribution

This article incorporates text from a publication now in the public domain: Stephen, Leslie, ed. (1887). "Chamier, Anthony". Dictionary of National Biography. Vol. 10. London: Smith, Elder & Co.

Parliament of Great Britain
Preceded by Edward Thurlow; Thomas de Grey	Member of Parliament for Tamworth; 1778–1780; With: Thomas de Grey to September 1780; John Courtenay from September 1780	Succeeded by John Calvert; John Courtenay
