= Jim Newhook =

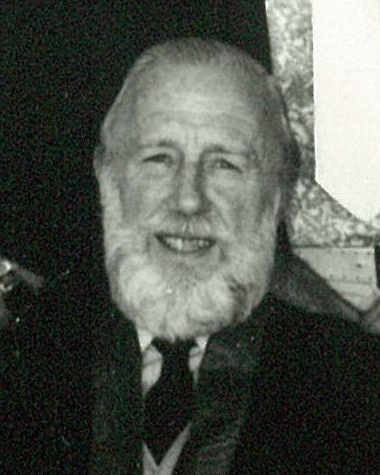
Newhook in 1974

James Carl Newhook (2 June 1915 – 17 May 1997) was a New Zealand veterinary scientist, university lecturer and writer.
