= Florence Ann Humphries =

Florence Ann Humphries (9 November 1915 – 12 January 1981) was a New Zealand housemaid, boarding-house manager, trade unionist and consumer advocate. She was born in Netherton, Thames/Coromandel, New Zealand on 9 November 1915.

Humphries was cremated and buried at Purewa Cemetery.
