= Jimmy James (dancer) =

New Zealand dancer, dance teacher and cabaret proprietor

Jimmy James (15 February 1915 – 4 July 1992) was a New Zealand dancer, dance teacher and cabaret proprietor. He was born in Athens, Greece on 15 February 1915.
