= John Adrian Chamier =

Royal Air Force officer (1883–1974)

- Chamier in 1931
- Born: 26 December 1883
- Died: 3 May 1974 (aged 90)
- Military career
- Allegiance: United Kingdom
- Branch: Royal Air Force
- Service years: 1902-29
- Rank: Air Commodore
- Nickname: "Founding Father of the ATC"
- Commands: Air Training Corps
- Conflicts: World War I World War II
- Awards: Knight Bachelor; Companion of the Order of the Bath; Companion of the Order of St Michael and St George; Distinguished Service Order; Officer of the Order of the British Empire; Mention in Despatches (2)
- Other work: Secretary of the Air League of the British Empire; Director of Vickers (Aviation) Ltd. BBC Correspondent

Air Commodore Sir John Adrian Chamier, CB, CMG, DSO, OBE (26 December 1883 – 3 May 1974) was a British officer of the Royal Air Force. Chamier is known as "The Founding Father of the ATC" for his role in the foundation of the Air Training Corps.

== Military career ==
=== Indian Army and Royal Air Force ===
Chamier was educated at the Royal Military College, Sandhurst. After passing out on 27 August 1902, his name was added to the Unattached List of the Indian Army, and he was in October posted to the Punjab command. He was commissioned into the Indian Army as a second lieutenant on 11 January 1904, but with seniority from 27 August 1902, and on 5 February 1904 was attached to the 33rd Punjabis, an Indian Army regiment. He was promoted captain on 27 August 1911. Chamier was commissioned as a flying officer into the Royal Flying Corps on 26 August 1915 and served as a pilot in the First World War.

After the war, he transferred to the newly formed Royal Air Force, in which he served the rest of his career, eventually retiring in 1929. From November 1921 to February 1922, as Deputy Director, Directorate of Operations and Intelligence, Air Ministry, he was a delegate to the Washington Conference on the Limitation of Armaments.

=== Air Training Corps ===
After retirement from the RAF, Chamier became secretary of the Air League of the British Empire. During his tenure as secretary Chamier became involved with the founding, in 1938 of the Air Defence Cadet Corps, which on 5 February 1941 evolved into the Air Training Corps because the ADCC was seen as too forceful and decided to change it to a more subtle name of ATC. He set up the ATC to promote recruitment in the RAF and to get young people who are interested in aviation to be able to go to their local squadron at their own free will, making it more enjoyable.

After it was founded, Chamier became the Air Training Corps' first Commandant, until his retirement in 1944. He was succeeded by Air Marshal Sir Leslie Gossage.

== Civilian career ==
Between 1928 and 1931 Chamier was a director on the board of Vickers (Aviation) Limited.

In the 1930s, Chamier and his company, Chamier, Gilbert-Lodge and Co acted as consultants for airport design and construction including those at Belfast Harbour and Luton.

Chamier was, at one time, the aviation correspondent for the British Broadcasting Corporation (BBC).

== Aircraft ==
Chamier had a Mignet HM.14 Flying Flea light aircraft registered G-ADME in his name between 1935 and 1938.

== Decorations ==
Chamier was made a Companion of the Order of the Bath (CB) in the 1925 Birthday Honours, the Order of St. Michael and St. George (CMG) in the 1919 Birthday Honours and the Distinguished Service Order in the 1917 New Year Honours, and an Officer of the Order of the British Empire (OBE) in the 1918 Birthday Honours. In the 1944 Birthday Honours he was knighted as a Knight Bachelor.

== Politics ==
Chamier was a member of and speaker at meetings of the January Club of the British Union of Fascists.

== Published works ==
- The Birth of the Royal Air Force, Pitman, London, (1943) (No ISBN), British Library Catalogue Entry

== Family ==
John Adrian Chamier married Edwina Ratcliffe Lordly (27 March 1890 - 31 May 1981) on the 20th February 1918 in Kensington. Together, they had two children: John Edwin DesChamps Chamier (9 January 1919 - 14 October 1997), who was a Sub-Lieutenant in the Royal Navy, Fleet Air Arm WW2, then a yachting journalist and the editor of 'Yachtsman', he was a Royal Yachting Association Olympic selector and served on the Royal Yachting Association Olympic Selection Committee for the Naples Games and served on the Royal London Yacht Club Sailing Committee. He married Petica Ann Alston (3 August 1926 - 23 January 2003); and Patrick Antony Chamier (19 February 1921 - 11 November 1940) who was a Sergeant Pilot, RAF Volunteer Reserve, killed while on active service in Rhodesia, buried at Harare (Pioneer) Cemetery. He never married or had children.

John Adrian Chamier was the son of Major-General Francis Edward Archibald Chamier (1833 - 1923) and his second wife, Amy Macdonnell Capper (11 July 1857 - 9 November 1938)

John Adrian Chamier was part of the 'DesChamps Chamier' family.
