= Matilda Lo Keong =

New Zealand storekeeper, homemaker and community worker

- Born: c. 1856; Bao'an District, China
- Died: 18 December 1915
- Occupations: Storekeeper, homemaker, community worker
- Known for: First identified Chinese female immigrant to New Zealand; early Chinese settler family history

Matilda Lo Keong (c.1856 – 18 December 1915) was a New Zealand storekeeper, homemaker and community worker. She was born in Bao'an District, China in c.1856. Lo Keong was the first identified Chinese female immigrant to New Zealand, where she raised the first known family of pure Chinese descent.
