= George Chamier =

George Chamier (8 April 1842–25 April 1915) was a New Zealand engineer, surveyor, chess player and novelist. He was born in Cheltenham, Gloucestershire, England on 8 April 1842. and died on 25 April 1915 in Shanghai.

Chamier's two novels, Philosopher Dick (1891) and A South Sea Siren (1895), drew on his experience living in the Ashley River District of the Canterbury Province of New Zealand from 1860-69. They have been described as "the two most substantial nineteenth-century novels set in New Zealand" and as "major milestones in the history of antipodean literature" due to their characterization and "strong element of analysis and contemplation applied to colonial society."

== Writings ==
- The Utilisation of Water in South Australia, 1886
- Philosopher Dick: Adventures and Contemplations of a New Zealand Shepherd, 1891
- A South Sea Siren: A Novel Descriptive of New Zealand Life in the Early Days, 1895
- The Story of a Successful Man, 1895
- War and Pessimism, and Other Studies, 1911
