= Denis Nyhan =

New Zealand harness racer (1939–2021)

Denis Donovan Nyhan (11 April 1939 – 1 September 2021), or D. D. Nyhan, was a New Zealand trainer and driver of standardbred racehorses winning many of New Zealand's premier racing events.

Nyhan won the New Zealand Trotting Cup twice with Lordship in 1962 and 1966. In 1962 Nyhan and Lordship beat Cardigan Bay driven by champion reinsman Peter Wolfenden who was 5th. In 1966 they beat Robin Dundee and Waitaki Hanover. Lordship, sired by Johnny Globe, was bred by Denis' mother Doris Nyhan and trained by his father Don (D G) Nyhan who drove Johnny Globe to win the New Zealand Cup in 1954. Lordship also won the 1964 Auckland Pacing Cup

In 1974 Nyhan won the New Zealand Cup with the free-legged pacer Robalan from Kotare Legend and Young Quinn.

Nyhan won the New Zealand Free For All five times: twice with Lordship (1962 and 1964) and three times with Robalan (1972, 1973 and 1974).

He also trained and drove the trotters Cee Ar to win the 1974 Rowe Cup and Hal Good to win the 1975 Dominion Handicap.

== Major wins ==
- 1961 New Zealand Derby – Lordship
- 1962 New Zealand Trotting Cup – Lordship
- 1962 New Zealand Free For All – Lordship
- 1964 Easter Cup – Lordship
- 1964 New Zealand Free For All – Lordship
- 1964 Auckland Cup – Lordship
- 1966 Easter Cup – Lordship
- 1966 New Zealand Trotting Cup – Lordship
- 1971 Northern Oaks – Van Glory
- 1972 New Zealand Free For All – Robalan
- 1973 New Zealand Free For All – Robalan
- 1974 New Zealand Free For All – Robalan
- 1974 Rowe Cup – Cee Ar
- 1974 New Zealand Trotting Cup – Robalan
- 1975 Easter Cup – Robalan
- 1975 Dominion Handicap – Hal Good
- 1991 Junior Free For All – Honkin Vision

== See also ==
- Harness racing in New Zealand
