= New Zealand Free For All =

- Class: Group one (G1)
- Location: Addington Raceway; Christchurch, New Zealand
- Inaugurated: 1914
- Race type: Standardbred - Harness racing
- Website: www.addington.co.nz

Race information
- Distance: 1,980 metres
- Track: Left-handed oval
- Qualification: Three-year-olds and up
- Purse: NZ$150,000 (2026)

The New Zealand Pacing Free For All is a major New Zealand harness race. It is notable as it is a Group One championship sprint race and has been won by nearly every champion pacer in New Zealand.

== History of the race ==
Horses which have won the Free-for-all include hall of famers and champions who later shone in the United States and Canada like Cardigan Bay and Caduceus. The latter who won the Free For All three times. The race has also been won three times by Robalan, Harold Logan, Lordship and Author Dillon. Between 1942 and 1948 the race was renamed the New Zealand Pacing Sprint Championship.

The race is contested at Addington Raceway on the Canterbury Anniversary public holiday and Canterbury A&P Show day on the Friday of "Cup week" in mid-November. With the New Zealand Trotting Cup run on the Tuesday of that week, the Free For All attracts most of the same horses as the Cup, and is often won in the same year by the same horse. There is also the New Zealand Cup for gallopers and a number of other premier races for the harness, thoroughbred and greyhound racing codes that week.

Distance

Unlike the New Zealand Cup it is run from a mobile, rather than standing, start. From 1914 to 1972 the event was generally over 1 1/4 miles or from 1973 onwards 2000 m, although from 1920 to 1927 it was a mile only. The 1962 race won by Lordship is recorded by HRNZ to have been over 9 1/2 furlongs. The 2008 race was won in record time (1.54-mile rate for 2000 m) by Auckland Reactor. For 2012 and 2013 the race was contested over 1 mile (1609 m), meaning the race will start on a bend. It was subsequently changed to 1950 m for 2013 to 2017 and has been over 1980 m for 2018 onwards.

Stake money

The total stake money for the race was:

- $200,000 (2025)
- $203,500 (2022)
- $165,600 (2020)
- $240,000 (2015)
- $200,000 (2010)
- $300,000 (2008)
- $100,000 (2000)
- $85,000 (1990)
- $18,000 (1980)
- $4,500 (1970)

== Records ==
Most wins:

- 3 - Author Dillon (1918, 1919, 1920)
- 3 - Caduceus (1956, 1958, 1959)
- 3 - Harold Logan (1931, 1934, 1936)
- 3 - Lordship (1962, 1964, 1967)
- 3 - Robalan (1972, 1973, 1974)

Most wins by a driver:

- 8 - Tony Herlihy (1987, 1990, 1991, 1993, 1997, 2006, 2012, 2023)
- 7 - Mark Purdon (1988, 1995, 2001, 2003, 2008, 2016, 2022)
- 5 - Denis Nyhan (1962, 1964, 1972, 1973, 1974)
- 4 - Maurice Holmes (1934, 1952, 1957, 1965)
- 4 - Natalie Rasmussen (2017, 2018, 2020, 2021)

== Results ==
Year	Horse	Owner(s)	Trainer(s)	Driver	Time	Second	Third
2026	Captains Mistress	Boots Properties Racing Pty Ltd	Jason Grimson, NSW	Cameron Hart	2:18.4 (1980m)	Leap To Fame	Minos
2025	Leap To Fame	Solid Earth Pty Ltd.	Grant Dixon, Qld	Grant Dixon	2:20.0 (1980m)	Republican Party	Merlin
2024	Merlin	Montana Park Pty Ltd	Barry Purdon & Scott Phelan	Zachary Butcher	2:25.3 (1980m)	Better Eclipse	Catch A Wave
2023	Self Assured	Mrs Jean Feiss	Mark & Nathan Purdon	Tony Herlihy	2:23.70 (1980m)	Akuta	Beach Ball
2022	Self Assured	Mrs Jean Feiss	Mark Purdon & Hayden Cullen	Mark Purdon	2:21.90 (1980m)	Majestic Cruiser	Old Town Road
2021	South Coast Arden	Mrs GJ Kennard, P I Kennard, Breckon Racing Syndicate, G A Woodham, Mrs K J Woodham, JA Gibbs MNZM, Mrs A Gibbs	Brent Mangos	Natalie Rasmussen	2:17.00 (1980m)	Self Assured	Krug
2020	Spankem	Mrs GJ Kennard, P I Kennard, Breckon Racing Syndicate, JA Gibbs MNZM, Mrs A Gibbs, G A Woodham, Mrs K J Woodham	Mark Purdon & Natalie Rasmussen	Natalie Rasmussen	2:19.20 (1980m)	Thefixer	Ashley Locaz
2019	Chase Auckland	Alabar Racing Syndicate	Mark Purdon & Natalie Rasmussen	Tim Williams	2:20.6 (1980m)	Classie Brigade	Cruz Bromac
2018	Cruz Bromac	D Zavitsanos, Mrs J Zavitsanos, P M O'Shea, Mrs Z D O'Shea, W R Viney	Mark Purdon & Natalie Rasmussen	Natalie Rasmussen	2:18.5 (1980m)	Turn It Up	Jack's Legend
2017	Ultimate Machete	Mrs GJ Kennard, P I Kennard, G R Douglas, K J Riseley, P J Creighton, Mrs M C Creighton	Mark Purdon & Natalie Rasmussen	Natalie Rasmussen	2:15.7 (1950m)	Tiger Tara	Jack's Legend
2016	Lazarus *	Mrs G J Kennard, P I Kennard, T G Casey, K Riseley	Mark Purdon & Natalie Rasmussen	Mark Purdon	2:16.3 (1950m)	Christen Me	Tiger Tara
2015	Tiger Tara	R L Sandford, Mrs J A Sandford, J S Gould, G R Dunn	Geoff Dunn	Gerard O'Reilly	2:18.9 (1950m)	Mossdale Conner	Messini
2014	Christen Me	C J Roberts, V L Purdon		Dexter Dunn	2:18.4 (1950m)	Adore Me	Franco Nelson
2013	Pembrook Benny	B Purdon, T F Henderson, J C Higgins, K G Parry, D H Sixton, J B Hart		Zachary Butcher	1:54.3 (1609m)	Easy On The Eye	Caribbean Blaster
2012	Gold Ace	Mrs W A Purdon, D G Moore, M Ng, D D Syndicate		Tony Herlihy	1:52.6 (1609m)	Pure Power	Terror to Love
2011	Smoken Up	A P Kay, P G Gadsby, A B Bonney, M J Van Rens, R J Kay, V MacDonald & L D Locastro		Lance Justice	2:25.3 (2000m)	Franco Emirate	Pembrook Benny
2010	Monkey King *	Cavalla Bloodstock Ltd		Ricky May	2:23.7 (2000m)	Bondy	Smoken Up
2009	Monkey King *	Cavalla Bloodstock Ltd		Ricky May	2:22.4 (2000m)	Nearea Franco	Changeover
2008	Auckland Reactor	Auckland Reactor Ltd		Mark Purdon	2:21.8 (2000m)	Awesome Armbro	Changeover
2007	Waipawa Lad	R K Bennett, F C Bennett		Mark Jones	2:22.0 (2000m)	Baileys Dream	Classic Cullen
2006	Sly Flyin	G W Brodie		Tony Herlihy	2:25.0 (2000m)	Flashing Red	Waipawa Lad
2005	Howard Bromac	Michelle Larsen, Mrs L Philpott, D Hardie		Kirk Larsen	2:23.3 (2000m)	London Legend	Just An Excuse
2004	Just An Excuse *	O Haines, Mrs I K Haines		Todd Mitchell	2:24.9 (2000m)	Mister D G	Jagged Account
2003	Jack Cade	J H Seaton, Mark Purdon		Mark Purdon	2:24.9 (2000m)	Jagged Account	Elsu
2002	Yulestar	Mrs Lorraine Nolan & Ron Nolan		Peter Jones	2:22.9 (2000m)	Young Rufus	Stars And Stripes
2001	Young Rufus	H Manolitsis, V, T & W Lynch, G J Carey, K R Hyslop		Mark Purdon	2:25.8 (2000m)	Kym's Girl	Makati Galahad
2000	Agua Caliente	Est D S & Mrs D E J Short/Mrs D E Woods/Miss S M Short		Glen Wolfenden	2:24.7 (2000m)	Yulestar	Zyuganov Leis
1999	Holmes D G	Second Five Syndicate		Barry Purdon	2:28.6 (2000m)	Yulestar	All Our Fella
1998	Christian Cullen *	I D & D A Dobson, B A O'Meara		Danny Campbell	2:26.0 (2000m)	Holmes D G	Happy Asset
1997	Brabham	Runvs Syndicate		Tony Herlihy	2:25.3 (2000m)	Iraklis	Silk Brocade
1996	Iraklis	R M Cameron, Kypros Kotzikas		Ricky May	2:24.4 (2000m)	Brabham	Whale Of A Tale
1995	Il Vicolo *	J H Seaton, Mark Purdon		Mark Purdon	2:25.1 (2000m)	Brabham	Lento
1994	Bee Bee Cee *	C J Calvert, Mrs J M Calvert		Jim Curtin	2:26.6 (2000m)	Master Musician	Lento
1993	Chokin *	Pacers Australia/M Joyce/J Loughnan/B De Boer		Tony Herlihy	2:25.9 (2000m)	Master Musician	Christopher Vance
1992	Blossom Lady *	Polly Syndicate		Anthony Butt	2:25.5 (2000m)	Sogo	Christopher Vance
1991	Christopher Vance *	R R Reid, Lorna Reid Synd., Mrs J C Reid		Tony Herlihy	2:26.8 (2000m)	The Bru Czar	Surmo Way
1990	Tight Connection	R Ellis/R Weavers/Horseplayers Syn/Club Connection Syn		Tony Herlihy	2:26.0 (2000m)	Reba Lord	Bold Sharvid
1989	Dillon Dean	D P Dwyer, Mrs H M C Burley		Colin De Filippi	2:27.3 (2000m)	Bold Sharvid	Inky Lord
1988	Tax Credit	C J Harvey, Mrs P A Harvey		Mark Purdon	2:25.7 (2000m)	Luxury Liner	Speedy Chaval
1987	Luxury Liner	R R Reid, Est L F Reid, Mrs J C Reid		Tony Herlihy	2:26.3 (2000m)	Lightning Blue	Frangelico
1986	Master Mood *	K L Williams, Mrs B A Williams, S F Wong, F B Wong		Kevin Williams	2:28.1 (2000m)	Our Mana	Borana
1985	Preux Chevalier	K J Lavin, Mrs W M Lavin		Barry Perkins	2:25.7 (2000m)	Camelot	Premiership
1984	Dillon Dale	K C Burley		D P E Dwyer	2:28.1 (2000m)	Enterprise	Our Mana
1983	Camelot	D H G Crofts		R D Butt	2:27.2 (2000m)	Hands Down	Stortford Lodge
1982	Bonnie's Chance	Mrs K A Grice & Mrs V B McGarry		Richard J Brosnan	2:28.5 (2000m)	Armalight	Hands Down
1981	Armalight *	H B Smith		R H Negus	2:23.5 (2000m)	Bonnie's Chance	Superior Chance
1980	Hands Down *	W H & Mrs M F McAughtrie		Peter Jones	2:29.3 (2000m)	Lord Module	Philippa Frost
1979	Lord Module *	Cecil Devine		Cecil Devine	2:26.7 (2000m)	Trevira	Trusty Scot
1978	Trusty Scot *	A M & J H Hunter		J H Hunter	2:29.1 (2000m)	Belmer's Image	Lord Module
1977	Balgove	W H & J P Roberts		R M Cameron	2:28.9 (2000m)	Greg Robinson	Stanley Rio
1976	Master Dean	N W Borlase		M R De Filippi	2:30.3 (2000m)	Final Curtain	Forto Prontezza
1975	Lunar Chance	K N Lawlor		K N Lawlor	2:28.2 (2000m)	Final Decision	Why Bill
1974	Robalan *	A T Devery, P N Hope & D D Nyhan		Denis Nyhan	2:26.6 (2000m)	Hi Foyle	Young Quinn
1973	Robalan	A T Devery, P N Hope & D D Nyhan		Denis Nyhan	2:34.4 (2000m)	Arapaho	Bomber Bill
1972	Robalan	A T Devery, P N Hope & D D Nyhan		Denis Nyhan	2:33.6	Globe Bay	Scottish Charm
1971	Bay Foyle	N R Johnstone		C J Parsons	2:34.4	Intrepid	Royal Trump
1970	Stella Frost	L H Tilson		Doody Townley	2:36	Radiant Globe	James
1968	Great Adios	Mrs P M Norton		B J Anderson	2:36.4	Allakasam	Humprey
1967	Lordship	Mrs Doris Nyhan		D G Nyhan	2:40.4	Allakasam	Indecision
1966	Waitaki Hanover	Mrs J & F Smith		Doody Townley	2:35	Lordship	Full Sovereign
1965	Robin Dundee	J W Hewitt		M F Holmes	2:37	Peerswick	Orbiter
1964	Lordship	Mrs D G Nyhan		Denis Nyhan	2:34.6	Orbiter	Jay Ar
1963	Cardigan Bay *	Mrs A D Dean		P T Wolfenden	2:34.6	Sun Chief	Vanderford
1962	Lordship *	Mrs Doris Nyhan		Denis Nyhan	2:27.6	Cardigan Bay	Jay Ar
1961	Cardigan Bay	Mrs A D Dean		P T Wolfenden	2:39	Scottish Command	Smokeaway
1960	False Step *	J Smyth		Cecil Devine	2:35.2	Lookaway	Thunder
1959	Caduceus	D D & D R Moore		J D Litten	2:36	Gentry	False Step
1958	Caduceus	D D & D R Moore		J D Litten	2:34.8	Gentry	Tactician
1957	Lookaway *	C L Rhodes		M F Holmes	2:35.8	Tactician	Suzendry
1956	Caduceus	D D & D R Moore		J D Litten	2:39.4	Johnny Globe	Thelma Globe
1955	Tactician	M C McTigue		M C McTigue	2:36.8	Johnny Globe	Our Roger
1954	Johnny Globe *	D G Nyhan		D G Nyhan	2:33.6	Ribands	Laureldale
1953	Johnny Globe	D G Nyhan		D G Nyhan	2:35.4	Adorian	Vedette
1952	Vedette	C Johnston & M Jenkins		M F Holmes	2:41.8	Soangetaha	Maori Home
1951	Maori Home	B Rushton & J W Duncan		W P Ireland	2:39.8	Maida Dillon	Soangetaha
1950	Parawa Derby	L T Padget		J B Pringle	2:38	Congo Song	Gay Knight
1949	Single Direct	Mrs M R & Bruce Elliott		E N Kennerley	2:37.2	Captain Gaillard	Knave Of Diamonds
1948	Highland Fling *	A T Kemble		L F Berkett	2:37.4	Single Direct	Integrity
1947	Sir Michael	C Tasker		R Young	2:39	Turco	Great Belwin
1946	Haughty (Dead-Heat)	B Grice		G McKendry	2:41.4		Josedale Grattan
1946	Turco (Dead-Heat)	A V Prenderville & J X Ferguson		G S Smith	2:41.4		
1945	Happy Man	J C South		C King	2:36.4	Gold Bar	Haughty
1944	Pacing Power	G Lancaster		R B Berry	2:38.4	Loyal Friend	Dusky Sound
1943	Springfield Globe	R B Berry		R B Berry	2:39	Fine Art	Gold Bar
1942	Gold Bar	A B Holmes		D C Watts	2:35	Haughty	Josedale Grattan
1941	Josedale Grattan *	Dr M G Pezaro & E G Bridgens		F J Smith	2:42.2	Nelson Eddy	Lightning lady
1940	Plutus	W J Gudsell		J Bryce jnr	2:46.6	Lightning lady	Great Jewel
1939	Icevus	H Rudd		R Young	2:41.8	Gallant Knight	Pot Luck
1938	Logan Derby	H Barnes		J A Stamford	2:39.4	Parisienne	Pot Luck
1937	Supertax	D Rodgers		G Mouritz	2:40	Roi L'or	Lucky Jack
1936	Harold Logan	E F C Hinds		R Townley jnr	2:39	Tempest	Red Shadow
1935	Indianapolis *	G J Barton		J Fraser jnr	2:39.4	Tempest	Roi L'or
1934	Harold Logan	E F C Hinds		M F Holmes	2:38.4	Roi L'or	Tempest
1933	Red Shadow	Mrs M Harrall		J Bryce	2:41.4	Kingcraft	Harold Logan
1932	Roi L'Or	P Brown		F Holmes	2:38.2	Harold Logan	Gold Country
1931	Harold Logan *	Miss E Hinds		R J Humphreys	2:40	Peter Bingen	Free Advice
1930	King Pointer	W McDonald		O E Hooper	2:39.8	Carmel	Wrackler
1929	Padlock	J A Mitchell		W Hughes	2:42.6	Peter Bingen	Logan Park
1928	Peter Bingen *	J J Kennerley		J J Kennerley	2:38.8	Prince Pointer	Jewel Pointer
1927	Native Chief	J Duffy		F G Holmes	2:11.2 (1 mile)	Peter Bingen	Bell Harold
1926	Great Bingen	J R McKenzie		D Withers	2:09 (1 mile)	Native Chief	Logan Chief
1925	Acron	J R McKenzie		A Butterfield	2:04.6 (1 mile)	Great Bingen	Machine Brick
1924	Acron	J R McKenzie		A Butterfield	2:03.6 (1 mile)	Realm	Logan Chief
1923	Logan Chief	J Duffy		J J Kennerley	2:07.6 (1 mile)	Great Hope	Happy Voyage
1922	Trix Pointer	W H Norton		F Holmes	2:09.4 (1 mile)	Onyx	Tatsy Dillon
1921	Albert Cling	M J Hannon		J McLennan	2:09.6 (1 mile)	Trix Pointer	Willie Lincoln
1920	Author Dillon	Executors J Knight		B Jarden	2:11.6 (1 mile)	Trix Pointer	Matchlight
1919	Author Dillon	Executors J Knight		B Jarden	2:44.4	Cathedral Times	Admiral Wood
1918	Author Dillon *	B Jarden		B Jarden	2:45.8	Adelaide Direct	Cathedral Times
1917	Cathedral Chimes	J Bryce		J Bryce	2:42.6	Author Dillon	Adelaide Direct
1916	Admiral Wood	Mrs A M Seymour		J Bryce	2:45	Cathedral Times	Tommy
1915	Our Thorpe	J Fleming		A Fleming	2:41.4	Country belle	Emmeline
1914	Eccentric	R T Reid		J Brankin	2:48.8	Emmeline	King Cole

* won the New Zealand Trotting Cup same year

Source: Full details of each year's race are contained on the Harness Racing New Zealand website

== See also ==
- Auckland Trotting Cup
- Dominion Handicap
- Great Northern Derby
- Inter Dominion Pacing Championship
- Inter Dominion Trotting Championship
- Miracle Mile Pace
- New Zealand Messenger
- New Zealand Trotting Cup
- New Zealand Derby
- Noel J Taylor Mile
- Rowe Cup
- TAB Eureka
- The Race by betcha
- Harness racing
- Harness racing in New Zealand
