= Auckland Pacing Cup =

- Class: Group I
- Location: Alexandra Park; Auckland, New Zealand
- Inaugurated: 1890
- Race type: Standardbred - Harness racing
- Website: www.alexandrapark.co.nz

Race information
- Distance: 3,200m
- Surface: Dirt
- Track: Oval, right-handed, mobile barrier
- Qualification: Three-year-olds and up
- Purse: NZ $250,000 (2025)

The Auckland Pacing Cup which is sometimes referred to as the Auckland Trotting Cup or merely the Auckland Cup is a race held at Alexandra Park in Auckland, New Zealand for Standardbred horses. It is one of the major harness races, along with the New Zealand Cup, held in New Zealand each year for the highest grade (Open class) pacers. It is a Group 1 championship race and has been won by many of the champion pacers in New Zealand.

== Cup history ==
For most of its history the Auckland Cup was raced in December, however at times it has been moved to other calendar dates such as:

- March, from 2006 until 2015, when it formed part of Auckland Cup Week, a carnival which included feature Thoroughbred races such as the gallops Auckland Cup and greyhound racing. As well as the March 2015 race (won by Christen Me) there was a second 2015 Auckland Cup raced in December (Have Faith In Me). Neither Christen Me or Have Faith In Me competed in the other race that year.
- January, in 1987 when won by Master Mood over 2,700m. In 1987 there was a second Auckland Cup in December, reverting to the 3,200m distance, won by Luxury Liner. Perhaps evidencing the competitiveness of the fields the January 1987 winner Master Mood could only place 9th in the December race whereas Luxury Liner, the winner in December could only achieve 6th in the earlier race.
- February, for the 1978 to 1986 (inclusive) years.
- May, from 2022 until 2024, it was raced to late May, on the same race-card as the Rowe Cup for Open Class trotters. The Northern Trotting Derby for 3 year old trotters was on the same night.

The Auckland Cup was moved back to New Years Eve in 2024. On the same night is the Group 1 National Trot (FFA).

=== Distance ===
The Auckland Cup is currently run over 3,200 metres from a mobile start.

The race started as a 3-mile event in 1890 to 1894 (inclusive) but it has traditionally been a 3,200m or 2 mile event apart from being a 2,700m journey for the races held from:

- March 2007 (won by Flashing Red) to March 2015 (Christen Me) before reverting to 3,200m for the 2016 year onwards.
- February 1978 (Sole Command) to January 1987 (Master Mood).

=== Stake money ===
The stake money for the Auckland Cup has fluctuated over the years:

- $250,000 for the 2025 year
- $180,000 for the 2023 year
- $400,000 for the 2022 year
- $196,000 for the 2020 year
- $245,000 for the 2019 year, which compared to $750,000 for the New Zealand Trotting Cup.
- $600,000 for the 2009 Auckland Cup ($1 million for the New Zealand Cup).

=== Famous Winners ===
Champion horses which have won the Auckland Cup include Hall of Fame inductees and champions like:

- Cardigan Bay
- Caduceus
- Young Quinn

The above horses went on to succeed in the United States and/or Canada.

It has been uncommon for female horses (mares) to win the Cup, the most recent being:

- Amazing Dream (2020).
- Flight South (2000).
- Kate's First (1997).

Delightful Lady, who was known as the “Queen of the Park”, won the race twice in 1980 and 1981.

=== Australian participation ===
As with the New Zealand Trotting Cup Australian trained horses sometimes make the journey to Alexandra Park, such as the following winners:

- Better Eclipse in 2024
- Themightyquinn (a former NZ horse) in 2011 and 2013
- Gammalite in 1982

== Records ==
Most wins by a driver:

- 8 - Tony Herlihy (1986, 1987, 1988, 1991, 1993, 1994, 1996, 2008)
- 7 - Mark Purdon (2002, 2009, 2016, 2018, 2019, 2020, 2023)
- 6 - P T Wolfenden (1960, 1961, 1963, 1978, 1983, 1984)
- 4 - J (James) Bryce jnr (1943, 1945, 1948, 1949)

Most wins by an owner:

- 4 - R A McKenzie (1957, 1959, 1971, 1985)

== Winners list ==
Year	Month	Distance	Horse	Hcap	Owner(s)	Driver	Time	Second Place	Third Place
2025	Dec	3200m	Republican Party	Fr (2)	Mrs Chrissie Dalgety, Grant Dickey, Mrs J E Rooney, G A Ayers, First Term Syndicate, D A Schollum, K J Cummings, B A Smith, G P Merlo, A & M Syndicate	Carter Dalgety	4:05.6	Akuta	Sooner The Bettor
2024	Dec	3200m	Republican Party	Fr (4)	Mrs Chrissie Dalgety, Grant Dickey, Mrs J E Rooney, G A Ayers, First Term Syndicate, D A Schollum, K J Cummings, B A Smith, G P Merlo, A & M Syndicate	Carter Dalgety	4:00.10	Merlin	Sooner The Bettor
2024	May	3200m	Better Eclipse	Fr (8)	Mrs A Bajada	Greg Sugars	3:59.4	Self Assured	Republican Party
2023	May	3200m	Akuta	Fr (9)	Cullen Breeding Limited, Mark Purdon	Mark Purdon	4:00.55	Self Assured	Smiffy's Terror
2022	May	3200m	Self Assured	Fr (6)	Mrs Jean Feiss, Melbourne	Natalie Rasmussen	3:58.96	Spankem	Kango
2021			Not held - COVID 19						
2020	Dec	3200m	Amazing Dream	Fr (3)	Mrs Jean Feiss, Melbourne	Mark Purdon	3:56.56	Spankem	Copy That
2019	Dec	3200m	Self Assured	Fr (3)	Mrs Jean Feiss, Melbourne	Mark Purdon	3:59.4	Thefixer	Triple Eight
2018	Dec	3200m	Turn It Up	Fr (6)	JA Gibbs MNZM, L Pilcher, Mark Purdon, Mrs A Gibbs	Mark Purdon	4:03.0	Star Galleria	Ashley Locaz
2017	Dec	3200m	Vincent (Aust)	Fr (4)	W R Feiss	Natalie Rasmussen	4:04.7	Titan Banner	Heaven Rocks
2016	Dec	3200m	Dream About Me	Fr (9)	CJ Roberts, Est Mrs JL Roberts, P G Kenny, Mrs ML Kenny	Mark Purdon	3:55.4	Hug The Wind	Arden's Choice
2015	Dec	3200m	Have Faith In Me	Fr (U1)	DM Dunford & MD Dunford	Tim Williams	4:06.0	Hughie Green	Smolda
2015	Mar	2700m	Christen Me	Fr (11)	CJ Roberts & VL Purdon	Dexter Dunn	3:13.8	Adore Me	Ohoka Punter
2014	Mar	2700m	Terror to Love	Fr (11)	McDonald Bloodstock Ltd	Ricky May	3:15.8	Adore Me	Saveapatrol
2013	Mar	2700m	Themightyquinn	Fr (8)	Mrs B Richardson, G L Moore, G Ralston, M Congerton	Gary Hall	3:16.7	Terror to Love	Better Cover Lover
2012	Mar	2700m	Sir Lincoln	Fr (4)	Lincoln Farms Ltd	Maurice McKendry	3:19:5	Terror to Love	Pembrook Benny
2011	Mar	2700m	Themightyquinn	Fr (9)	Mrs B Richardson, G L Moore, G Ralston, M Congerton	Gary Hall	3:16.72	Mr Feelgood	Pembrook Penny
2010	Mar	2700m	Monkey King	Fr (4)	Cavalla Bloodstock Limited	Ricky May	3:21.0	Tintin in America	Baileys Dream
2009	Mar	2700m	Auckland Reactor	Fr (8)	Auckland Reactor Ltd	Mark Purdon	3:18.5	Monkey King	Awesome Armbro
2008	Mar	2700m	Gotta Go Cullen	Fr (11)	I D Dobson	Tony Herlihy	3:20.0	Monkey King	Baileys Dream
2007	Mar	2700m	Flashing Red	Fr (1)	Ravelyn Pty Ltd, Jenkscraft Pty Ltd	Anthony Butt	3:17.2	Classic Cullen	Sly Flyin
2006	Mar	3200m	Mi Muchacho	Fr (7)	R C Anderson, Ms P C Larsen	Peter Ferguson	4:05.7	Mainland Banner	Lord Vader
2005	Dec	3200m	Howard Bromac	Fr (4)	Michelle Larsen, L Philpott, D Hardie	Kirk Larsen	4:03.0	Alta Serena	Napoleon
2004	Dec	3200m	Elsu	10m (U2)	J Walters/Double Up Synd/Est D Hudson/P Small	David Butcher	4:05.1	Oscar Wild	Howard Bromac
2003	Dec	3200m	Elsu	Fr (10)	J Walters/Double Up Synd/Est D Hudson/P Small	David Butcher	4:00.5	Just An Excuse	Holmes D G
2002	Dec	3200m	Young Rufus	Fr (3)	Manolitsis/V, T & W Lynch/G Carey/K Hyslop	Mark Purdon	4:00.6	Yulestar	Facta Non Verba
2001	Dec	3200m	Holmes D G	Fr	Second Five Syndicate	Barry Purdon	4:03.4	Yulestar	Gracious Knight
2000	Dec	3200m	Flight South	Fr	J Yardley, K J McNamara, A P Neal	Andrew Neal	4:02.6	Yulestar	Holmes DG
1999	Dec	3200m	Happy Asset	Fr	J J O'Donnell, M K Rodgers, D J MacDonald	Anthony Butt	4:01.8	Yulestar	Breeny's Fella
1998	Dec	3200m	Christian Cullen	10 m	I D Dobson, Mrs D A Dobson, Brian A O'Meara	Danny Campbell	3:59.7	Bogan Fella	Kate's First
1997	Dec	3200m	Kate's First	Fr	G H Beirne, P R Bielby	Peter Ferguson	4:01.2	Brabham	Happy Asset
1996	Dec	3200m	Sharp and Telford	Fr	A J Parker, P R A Parker, N I Gillanders	Tony Herlihy	4:02.2	Anvil Vance	Surprise Package
1995	Dec	3200m	Burlington Bertie	Fr	P D Bagrie, A G Bagrie, A Spark, S Spark	Colin De Filippi	4:02.1	Desperate Comment	Brabham
1994	Dec	3200m	Chokin	15 m	Pacers Australia/M Joyce/J Loughlan/B De Boer	Tony Herlihy	4:02.6	Victor Supreme	Master Musician
1993	Dec	3200m	Chokin	10 m	Pacers Australia/M Joyce/J Loughlan/B De Boer	Tony Herlihy	3:59.5	Franco Ice	Christopher Vance
1992	Dec	3200m	Master Musician	Fr	Robert J Dunn, Ken L McDonald, Eugene C Storck	Robert Dunn	4:03.2	Christopher Vance	The Bru Czar
1991	Dec	3200m	Christopher Vance	10 m	R R Reid, Lorna Reid Syndicate, J C Reid	Tony Herlihy	4:04.2	Starship	The Bru Czar
1990	Dec	3200m	The Bru Czar	Fr	Geoff A West, Jenny G West	Gary Hillier	4:02.4	Christopher Vance	Tight Connection
1989	Dec	3200m	Neroship	Fr	G John Webber, Neil W Webber	John Langdon	4:10.0	Gypsy Vance	Kylie's Hero
1988	Dec	3200m	Luxury Liner	15 m	Robert Reid, Lorna Reid Syndicate, J C Reid	Tony Herlihy	4:03.8	Kylie's Hero	Gina Rosa
1987	Dec	3200m	Luxury Liner	Fr	R Reid, Est L F Reid, J C Reid	Tony Herlihy	4:05.3	Gaelic Skipper	Skipper Dale
1987	Jan	2700m	Master Mood	Fr	K L & B A Williams, S F & F B Wong	Kevin Williams	3:24.4	Skipper Dale	Quiet Touch
1986	Feb	2700m	Comedy Lad	Fr (6)	M L Harvey	Tony Herlihy	3:22.4	Roydon Glen	Direct Kiwi
1985	Feb	2700m	Roydon Glen	Fr	Roy A McKenzie	W Fred Fletcher	3:25.8	Hilarious Guest	Comedy Lad
1984	Feb	2700m	Enterprise	Fr	P D & C T Heffernan	Peter Wolfenden	3:27.4	Our Mana	Dillon Dale
1983	Feb	2700m	Armalight	Fr	H (Brent) Smith	Peter Wolfenden	3:20.7	Hilarious Guest	Hands Down
1982	Feb	2700m	Gammalite	Fr	Leo F O'Connor	W Bruce Clarke	3:24.6	Bonnie's Chance	Delightful Lady
1981	Feb	2700m	Delightful Lady	Fr	A & Paul Grant	Mike J Stormont	3:22.9	Idolmite	Lord Module
1980	Feb	2700m	Delightful Lady	Fr	A & P Grant	Mike J Stormont	3:25.1	Lord Module	Sapling
1979	Feb	2700m	Sapling	Fr	George C and Gladys M Cruickshank & Lionel Given	Henry W Skinner	3:30.5	Belmer's Image	Royal Wardorf
1978	Feb	2700m	Sole Command	Fr	B J & M I Walker & R C Purdon	Peter Wolfenden	3:26.4	Captain Harcourt	Nimble Yankee
1976	Dec	3200m	Bolton Byrd	Fr	Jim Dalgety, West Melton	Robert Dunn	4:13.7	Forto Prontezza	Classic Move
1975	Dec	3200m	Captain Harcourt	Fr	E J Bennett	Tommy H Knowles	4:10.2	Speedy Guest	Noodlum
1974	Dec	3200m	Young Quinn	10 m	D J & R O Baynes	Charlie Hunter, Cambridge	4:16	Robalan	Hi Foyle
1973	Dec	3200m	Arapaho	20 m	Laurie Forde	Jack Smolenski	4:11.2	Young Quinn	Black Watch
1972	Dec	2 mi	Royal Ascot	Fr	C J McLaughlin & F E Newfield	Felix Newfield	4:14-8	Scottish Charm	Manaroa
1971	Dec	2 mi	Garcon Roux	Fr	R A McKenzie	John B Noble	4:22.4	Bella's Command	Rain Again
1970	Dec	2 mi	Stella Frost	Fr	L H Tilson	Doody Townley	4:11.8	Scottish Charm	Holy Hal
1969	Dec	2 mi	Leading Light	Fr	H S Kruse, T Lock & J G Power	Derek G Jones	4:27	Holy Hal	Stella Frost
1968	Dec	2 mi	Cardinal Garrison	Fr	R C Nelmes & P G Trigg	Tommy H Knowles	4:09.2	Loyal Knight	Cuddle Doon
1967	Dec	2 mi	Allakasam	Fr	C J McLaughlin	Alan M Harrison	4:14.4	Chequer Board	Julie Hanover
1966	Dec	2 mi	Waitaki Hanover	24 yd	J & F Smith	Doody Townley	4:13.6	Tobias	Viking Water
1965	Dec	2 mi	Robin Dundee	12 yd	J W Hewitt	Maurice Holmes	4:13	Gay Robin	Orbiter
1964	Dec	2 mi	Lordship	36 yd	Doris Nyhan	Denis Nyhan	4:11.4	Jay Ar	Great Adios
1963	Dec	2 mi	Cardigan Bay	78 yd	A D Dean	Peter Wolfenden	4:11.2	Tactile	Vanderford
1962	Dec	2 mi	Dandy Briar	Fr	J Steel	C S (Ces) Donald	4:21.8	Cardigan Bay	Susan Blue
1961	Dec	2 mi	Cardigan Bay	Fr	A D Dean	Peter Wolfenden	4:18	King Hal	Samantha
1960	Dec	2 mi	Damian	24 yd	L J R Barrett	Peter Wolfenden	4:23	Smokeaway	Sebabu
1959	Dec	2 mi	Scottish Command	60 yd	R A McKenzie	Ian W Hunter	4:17	Caricature	Great Reveller
1958	Dec	2 mi	Macklin	Fr	J H, R H & M T Butterick	John H Butterick	4:25	Derive	Scottish Command
1957	Dec	2 mi	Highland Air	12 yd	R A McKenzie	George B Noble	4:24.4	Gentry	Trueco
1956	Dec	2 mi	Unite	12 yd	V Leeming	Doug C Watts	4:26.6	Mighty Fine	Worthy Chief
1955	Dec	2 mi	Prince Polka	Fr	G Carmichael	Noel L Berkett	4:20.6	Secure	Greek Brigade
1954	Dec	2 mi	Caduceus	Fr	D D & D R Moore	Jack D Litten	4:19	Bartender	Goldina
1953	Dec	2 mi	Thelma Globe	12 yd	A C & A S Sandston	Jack B Pringle	4:16.6	Pleasant Smile	Soangetaha
1952	Dec	2 mi	Soangetaha	36 yd	M A Ryland	Derek G Jones	4:12	Laureldale	Adorian
1951	Dec	2 mi	Soangetaha	Fr	M A Ryland	Derek G Jones	4:19	Mighty Song	Scimitar
1950	Dec	2 mi	Victory Globe	Fr	E L McKeon	R (Bob) Young	4:14	First Lord	Parawa derby
1949	Dec	2 mi	Captain Sandy	36 yd	J M Bain	James Bryce jnr	4:21.4	Dundee Sandy	Plunder Bar
1948	Dec	2 mi	Captain Sandy	Fr	J M Bain	James Bryce jnr	4:18	Local Gold	Maudeen
1947	Dec	2 mi	Single Direct	12 yd	M R & Bruce Elliott	Edgar N Kennerley	4:24.8	Sprayman	Ingle Belmer
1946	Dec	2 mi	Loyal Nurse	12 yd	C V May	Clarry V May	4:22.4	Great Belwin	Aberhall
1945	Dec	2 mi	Sea Born	12 yd	C Johnston	James Bryce jnr	4:27.2	Volo Senwod	Double Peter
1944	Dec	2 mi	Betty Boop	12 yd	P Reid	Denny McKendry	4:21	Lady Dawn	Black Label
1943	Dec	2 mi	Loyal Friend	24 yd	A J Wilson	W J (Bill) Doyle	4:24.4	Black Label	Parshall
1943	Jan	2 mi	Shadow Maid	24 yd	G Chesmar	James Bryce jnr	4:22	Joan Conquest	Katene
1941	Dec	2 mi	Uenuku	12 yd	R A McMillan	R A (Alan) McMillan	4:28	Clockwork	Te Roto
1940	Dec	2 mi	Ned Worthy	Fr	H Hunter	W J (Bill) Doyle	4:26	Bold Venture	Molly Direct
1939	Dec	2 mi	Marlene	Fr	C S Donald	C S (Ces) Donald	4:22.4	Bayard	Uenuku
1938	Dec	2 mi	Navy Blue	Fr	Messrs Gough & Sanders	M Stewart	4:28	Kenworthy	Toorak
1937	Dec	2 mi	Willow Wave	Fr	D Windle & W McDonald	Ossie Hooper	4:20.4	King's Warrior	Lucky Jack
1936	Dec	2 mi	King's Warrior	Fr	B C Lincoln	F J Smith	4:20.8	Rey Spec	Red Shadow
1935	Dec	2 mi	Graham Direct	12 yd	J Westerman	Free Holmes	4:26.4	Rey Spec	Worthy Light
1934	Dec	2 mi	Roi L'Or	48 yd	P Brown	Free Holmes	4:15.4	Worthy Light	Blue Mountain
1933	Dec	2 mi	Indianapolis	Fr	G J Barton	W J (Bill) Tomkinson	4:26.4	Sir Guy	Pegaway
1932	Dec	2 mi	Great Parrish	Fr	J T Paul	Jim T Paul	4:26.8	Nelson's Victory	Peter Pirate
1931	Dec	2 mi	Royal Silk	Fr	M Harrall	Jack S Shaw	4:29.4	Muriel de Oro	Pluto
1930	Dec	2 mi	Carmel	Fr	J W Murphy	C S (Ces) Donald	4:25.6	Harold Logan	Jewel Pointer
1929	Dec	2 mi	Gold Jacket	48 yd	E J Parker	Andrew Bryce	4:33.4	Peter Bingen	Padlock
1928	Dec	2 mi	Gold Jacket	12 yd	E J Parker	Andrew Bryce	4:30.2	Kohara	Prince Pointer
1927	Dec	2 mi	Ahuriri	36 yd	R M Morten	J (Scotty) Bryce	4:25.6	Jack Potts	Machine Gun
1926	Dec	2 mi	Talaro	12 yd	C E Lindsay	Maurice Holmes	4:31	Sea Pearl	Queen's Own
1925	Dec	2 mi	Nelson Derby	Fr	G J Barton	W J (Bill) Tomkinson	4.29.4	Audacious	First Carbine
1924	Dec	2 mi	Locanda Mac	Fr	N Gunn	A Fleming	4.36.6	Logan Chief	Ahuriri
1923	Dec	2 mi	Blue Mountain King	12 yd	McKendrick Bros	George A McKendrick	4.30.4	Steel Bell	Linden
1922	Dec	2 mi	Minton Derby	Fr	C W Griffin	Peter Riddle	4.32.2	Comedy Chief	Great Hope
1921	Dec	2 mi	Man O'War	96 yd	J R Corrigan	Andrew Bryce	4.31	First Carbine	Dean Dillon
1920	Dec	2 mi	Man O'War	84 yd	J Corrigan	J (Scotty) Bryce	4.29.4	Oruarangi	Dean Dillon
1919	Dec	2 mi	Norah Creina	12 yd	W Orange	W (Bill) Orange	4.33.4	Colenut	Gold Girl
1918	Dec	2 mi	Harold Junior	24 yd	A Brown	A Brown	4.38	Steel Bell	Moneymaker
1917	Dec	2 mi	Steel Bell	96 yd	T Roe	James Lynch	4.33.8	Waverley	Asturio
1916	Dec	2 mi	Admiral Wood	144 yd	A M Seymour	A Julian	4.52.4	Childsdale	Papanui
1915	Dec	2 mi	Cathedral Chimes	9 sec	J B Thomson	J (Scotty) Bryce	4.40.2	Hal Zolock	Master Park
1914	Dec	2 mi	Steel Bell	7 sec	T Roe	James Lynch	4.38.4	Prince Rufus	Harvey Huon
1913	Dec	2 mi	Jewel Chimes	14 sec	J D Piper	Dan Nyhan	4.39.6	Pearl Child	Gold Bell
1912	Dec	2 mi	Mandarene	scr	J G Lecky	W C Hird	4.40.4	Master Ilam	Haldane
1911	Dec	2 mi	Bingana	11 sec	F Porangi	J West	4.44.8	Cavalier	Gold Bell
1910	Dec	2 mi	Floranz	8 sec	Preece & Hamilton	S Hamilton	4.53.8	Papanui	Baxter
1909	Dec	2 mi	Havoc	17 sec	D Nyhan	Dan Nyhan	4.58.2	Papanui	Floranz
1908	Dec	2 mi	Scotia	5 sec	J Parsons	W (Bill) Orange	4.57.4	Woodbury	Cavalier
1907	Dec	2 mi	All Night	15 sec	W A Scott	W A Scott	5.15.2	Viscount	Huon Leal
1906	Dec	2 mi	Typewriter	14 sec	C Baker	Baker snr	4.54.2	Waitekauri	Duke C
1905	Dec	2 mi	Le Rosier	15 sec	W C Watt	S Hamilton	5.7.4	Waitekauri	Harold Abdallah
1904	Dec	2 mi	Rebel Boy	7 sec	T Penny	W C Hird	5.03	Specialist	Rushlight
1903	Dec	2 mi	Plain G	10 sec	L Robertson	Lou Robertson	5.07	Empress	Typewriter
1902	Dec	2 mi	Van Dieman	20 sec	J Pettie	E McCann	5.06	Taiho	Bill
1901	Dec	2 mi	Thorndean	26 sec	H Grant	Andy Pringle	5.14.6	Verice	Miss Huon
1900	Dec	2 mi	Cob	34 sec	W Singleton	E Murfitt	5.31.2	Viscount	Larry
1899	Dec	2 mi	Billy Wilson	32 sec	W C Hird	W C Hird	5.22.2	Albert Victor	Cob
1898	Dec	2 mi	Duke C	scr	R McBride	H Chatteris	5.9.2	Pioke	Otakeho
1897	Dec	2 mi	Awahuri	38 sec	C C Miles	E Murfitt	5.32	Bellman (2nd equal)	Vulture (2nd equal)
1896	Dec	3 mi	Fibre	50 sec	J Gage	G Clarke	8.37	Bellman	Maud
1895	Dec	2 mi	Old Judge	28 sec	E G Sandall	E G (Ted) Sandall	5.31	Duke C	Ruby
1894	Dec	3 mi	Tom Hicks	75 sec	E G Sandall	E G (Ted) Sandall	8.48	Ida	Rotherham
1893	Dec	3 mi	Sandfly	64 sec	B Tanner	Sam Tanner	8.50.2	Hurricane	Ruby
1892	Dec	3 mi	Little Ben	53 sec	H Lowe	L Goodwin	8.36	Fairy	Ike
1891	Dec	3 mi	Rarus	25 sec	A E Green	W Stevenson	8.49.6	Brandy (Relegated from 1st)	Bess
1890	Dec	3 mi	Commodore	40 sec	S Heaney	Dinny Hartford	10.06.6	Maud	Lord William

== See also ==
- Dominion Handicap
- Great Northern Derby
- New Zealand Free For All
- New Zealand Messenger
- New Zealand Trotting Cup
- New Zealand Trotting Derby
- Noel J Taylor Mile
- Rowe Cup
- The Race by betcha
- New Zealand Horse of the Year
- Harness racing in New Zealand
- Inter Dominion Pacing Championship
- Inter Dominion Trotting Championship
- Miracle Mile Pace
