= Chariots of Fire (harness race) =

Harness race held in Australia

The Chariots of Fire is the single richest four-year-old harness race for Standardbreds in Australia. It is raced at Menangle in March.

== Race results ==
Past winners and place-getters are as follows:

Year	Horse	Driver	Time	Second	Third
2026	Captains Mistress	Cameron Hart	1:49.8	Final Deadline	Sinaloa
2025	Bay Of Biscay	Cameron Hart	1:49.1	Charge Ahead	Major Hot
2024	Frankie Ferocious	Cameron Hart	1:49.4	Sooner The Better	Captains Knock
2023	Catch A Wave	Kate Gath	1:49.1	Captain Ravishing	Cantfindabettorman
2022	Better Eclipse	Greg Sugars	1:47.6	Bondi Lockdown	Chevron Art
2021	Expensive Ego	Luke McCarthy	1:48.9	Zeuss Bromac	Kowalski Analysis
2020	Lochinvar Art	D N Moran	1:50.1	Self Assured	Max Delight
2019	Poster Boy	Chris Alford	1:49.1	Ashley Locaz	Hail Christian
2018	Jilliby Kung Fu	J P Lee	1:48.8	Let It Ride	Atomic Red
2017	Lazarus	Mark Purdon	1:49.0	Our Waikiki Beach	Salty Robyn
2016	Have Faith In Me	Natalie Rasmussen	1:48.8	Lord Zin Zan	Arms Of An Angle
2015	Our Sky Major	Zac Butcher	1:51.5	Bling It On	Isaiah
2014	Guaranteed	G Lang	1:50.4	Ginger Bliss	Majestic Mach
2013	Christen Me	Dexter Dunn	1:50.5	Smolda	Restrepo
2012	Caribbean Blaster	Kate Gath	1:52.6	Excel Stride	The Phantom
2011	Lanercost	D W Graham	1:52.5	Bitobliss	Matai Zinga
2010	Villagem	L Miles	1:52.1	Ima Rocket Star	Deadestlucky
2009	Maffioso	C A Alford	1:59.4	Im Themightyquinn	Ben Junior
2008	Ebony Gem	J J Caldow	1:57.4	Lombo Pocket Watch	Melpark Major
2007	Not run				
2006	Innocent Eyes	Gavin Lang	1:57.6	Emmas Only	Make Me Smile
2005	Slipnslide	L A McCarthy	1:58.5	Karloo Mick	Mister Martini
2004	Elsu	David J Butcher	1:57.8	Napoleon	The Warp Drive
2003	Oaxaca Lass	J F Curtin	1:59.5	Dinki Di	Blue Gum Forest
2002	Manifold Bay	Gavin Lang	1:58.7	Young Rufus	Selby Bromac
2001	Smooth Satin	A S Turnbull	1:57.7	Seelster Sam	Jofess
2000	Lombo Rapida	Kerryn Manning	1:58.0	Shakamaker	Stoney Lad
1999	Holmes D G	Barry Purdon	1:58.4	Kingstar	Ole Black Magic
1998	Franco Hat Trick	Tony Herlihy	2:00.4	Country Duke	Breenys Fella
1997	Kentuckiana	R B Byrnes	1:57.9	Denver Gift	Laneway
1996	Beefy T	M J Langdon	2:00.7	Il Vicolo	Blueagle
1995	Ginger Man	Tony Herlihy	1:59.9	The Suleiman	Astral Francais

== See also ==
- A G Hunter Cup
- Australian Pacing Championship
- Inter Dominion Pacing Championship
- Miracle Mile Pace
- New Zealand Trotting Cup
- Queensland Pacing Championship
- Victoria Cup
- Harness racing in Australia
