= Delightful Lady =

New Zealand Standardbred racehorse

- Breed: Standardbred
- Sire: Tudor Hanover (USA)
- Grandsire: Tar Heel (USA)
- Dam: Desilu (NZ)
- Maternal grandsire: U Scott (USA)
- Sex: Mare
- Foaled: 1 September 1973
- Country: New Zealand
- Colour: Black
- Breeder: David W J Anderson (NZ)
- Owner: Dave Anderson (leased by Paul H & A M (Fred) Grant, Auckland)
- Trainer: (1) Michael Stormont (2) Gary Hillier

Earnings
- $424,000

Major wins
- Auckland Pacing Cup (1980, 1981)
- Last updated on: 2009-04-27.

Delightful Lady was a New Zealand Standardbred racemare.

She is notable in that she twice won the Auckland Pacing Cup, which is one of the richest harness races in New Zealand.

Delightful lady was known as the "Queen of the Park" at Alexandra Park, Auckland where she won 38 races. She held the record for the most wins (47) in harness races in New Zealand, which included:

- The April 1979, 1980, 1981, 1982 and 1983 North Island Breeders’ Stakes.
- January 1980 - New Zealand Standardbred Breeders Stakes at Addington
- February 1980 - Auckland Cup, beating Lord Module and Sapling.
- February 1981 - Auckland Cup, beating Idolmite and Lord Module in a national record of 3:22.9 (2700m mobile).
- November 1980 - Franklin Cup, beating Greg Robinson and Jawa Boy. She won in 4:05.8 (from a 55m handicap) breaking Young Quinn’s 3200m standing start national record.
- 1983 Interdominion Heat at Auckland, beating Gammalite and Dundas in a national record of 2:42.3 (2200m mobile).

She was also:

- second in the 1980 New Zealand Trotting Cup (off a 15m handicap) behind Hands Down, with Sapling third.
- third in the 1982 Auckland Cup behind Gammalite and Bonnies Chance.
- third in the 1983 Inter Dominion Pacing Championship behind Gammalite and Popular Alm.

Delightful Lady was initially trained and usually driven by Michael Stormont. After a disappointing race in November 1981 he considered she should be allowed to retire. However her owner Dave Anderson believed she could carry on and Gary Hillier took over as trainer and driver.

Delightful Lady was only the second mare to win two Auckland Cups, after Steel Bell in 1914 and 1917.

She was awarded the New Zealand Horse of the Year title for the 1980/81 season. As a notable champion, she was also inducted into the New Zealand Trotting Hall of Fame with other immortals.

Delightful Lady was unfortunately unable to have any foals.

== See also ==
- Harness racing in New Zealand

== Reference list ==
Bisman, Ron (1989). Harness Heroes Meadowset Publishing Limited, Auckland.
