= Yulestar =

New Zealand Standardbred racehorse

- Breed: Standardbred
- Sire: Cameleon
- Grandsire: Cam Fella
- Dam: Victoria Star
- Maternal grandsire: Lordship
- Sex: Gelding
- Foaled: 25 December 1994
- Country: New Zealand
- Trainer: Lorraine Nolan

Record
- 170:34-28-24

Earnings
- $1,985,266

Awards
- New Zealand Horse of the Year (2000/01)
- Last updated on: 27 October 2022.

Yulestar (foaled 25 December 1994 – died 2019) was a New Zealand Standardbred racehorse, notable for winning the 2000 New Zealand Trotting Cup and the 2001 Inter Dominion Pacing Championship. He was awarded the title of New Zealand Harness Horse of the Year for the 2000/01 season.

Yulestar got his name because he was born on Christmas Day. He was bred by Mrs M V Law and bought for $9,000 by Lorraine and Ron Nolan, from Hawera, Taranaki.

Yulestar was trained by Lorraine Nolan and his win in the 2000 race meant she was the first woman to train a New Zealand Cup winner.

He was driven by Tony Shaw and then later by Peter Jones.

From 2003 to 2006 Yulestar raced in the United States and Canada, winning 13 races, trained by former New Zealander Brett Pelling. After his last race in 2006, he returned to Hawera and he died in 2019 aged 25.

== Notable races ==
Yulestar's career included:

- January 2000 - 1st in the A G Hunter Cup beating Happy Asset and Slug Of Jin
- November 2000 - 1st in the New Zealand Trotting Cup beating Bogan Fella and Kym's Girl. In this race he set a New Zealand record for the 3200m standing start of 3:59.1 beating the previous mark of 3:59.5 set by Chokin winning the 1993 Auckland Pacing Cup. Yulestar's record stood until Flashing Red bettered it in the 2007 New Zealand Cup with 3:57.8.
- May 2001 - 1st in the Inter Dominion Pacing Championship (Albion Park) beating Atitagain and Pocket Me as well as Courage Under Fire, Shakamaker and Holmes D G
- November 2002 - 1st in the New Zealand Free For All beating Young Rufus and Stars And Stripes. In this race he set a New Zealand record for the 2000m mobile when winning in 2:22.9 beating the previous mark of Iraklis (2:24.3 in 1996). The record was not broken until the 2007 New Zealand Free For All won by Waipawa Lad (2:22.0).

Yulestar was placed 2nd in the Auckland Cup on four occasions:

- 1999 behind Happy Asset with Breeny's Fella 3rd
- 2000 behind Flight South with Holmes DG 3rd
- 2001 behind Holmes DG with Gracious Knight 3rd
- 2002 behind Young Rufus with Facta Non Verba 3rd

== See also ==
- Harness racing in New Zealand
