= The Race by Sport Nation mobile pace =

The Race by betcha mobile pace
- Class: Listed
- Location: Cambridge Raceway, New Zealand
- Inaugurated: 2022
- Race type: Standardbred - Flat racing

Race information
- Distance: 2200m
- Surface: All weather
- Track: Left-handed oval
- Qualification: 3 year old and older pacers
- Purse: NZ $1,000,000 (2026)

The Race by betcha is a race for 3 year old and older harness horses run at Cambridge Raceway, New Zealand, by the Waikato Bay of Plenty Harness club. Formerly known as The Race by Grins, it is raced over 2200m from a mobile start and is a slot race.

== History ==
The race was first held in 2022. It involves each potential race entry (slot) being sold to a purchaser (slot holder) who secures a spot in the race for three years. The slot holder may then liaise with the trainers and owners of high quality racehorses that may potentially fill the slot and contest the race. The slot holders will enter into independent arrangements with the horse owners/trainers in regards the distribution of any prize money won.

The Race is therefore similar to the TAB Eureka a standardbred slot race run at Tabcorp Park Menangle, New South Wales, in September each year and The Everest a thoroughbred slot race held at Randwick Racecourse in Sydney which is the World's richest horse race on turf, with a $20 million prize pool in 2024.

In 2022, one of the horses was withdrawn prior to the fields being drawn. From 2023 the Race by Grins has a pool of horses available from which slot holders can select a replacement for any horse withdrawn prior to acceptance time. There will also be one emergency drawn in the field.

Grins, the initial race sponsor is a ready-to-drink alcoholic beverage associated with New Zealand rugby representatives Stephen Donald, Anton Lienert-Brown and Damian McKenzie.

It was intended to introduce a trotting version of the slot race in 2023 but this did not occur due to a lack of funding. However, in 2024 an inaugural trotters slot event, the TAB Mobile Trot was held for a stake of $600,000 The two slot races attracted the best combined fields of New Zealand and Australian horses for many years.

The 2024 edition was won by Merlin in a time of 2:35.1 which set a new New Zealand record for the 2200m journey beating the previous record of 2:35.4 by Ultimate Sniper in November 2019.

Grins ceased sponsorship after the 2024 edition. In 2025 the naming rights for the race were taken over by Entain for their digital betting brand betcha and it became known as "The Race by betcha".

The 2025 edition again attracted a top field with 2023 and 2024 Inter Dominion Pacing Championship winners Leap To Fame and Don Hugo coming across from Australia.

For the 2026 event the naming rights were taken over by the Sports Nation radio station. A strong field was assembled, featuring the Australians Captains Knock, Kingman, Leap To Fame, Swayzee and The Janitor and as well as the New Zealand trained Akuta, Better Knuckle Up, Merlin, Republican Party and We Walk By Faith. However, Leap To Fame won easily and was reported to have "produced the most brutal and beautiful performance of his rule-breaking career when he sat parked and smashed most of the best pacers in Australasia". This followed the Australian mare, Keayang Zahara, easily winning the other feature, the $530,000 TAB Trot.

== Race results ==
The past winners of the race are as follows:

Year	Stake	Winner	Driver	Trainer(s)	Time	Second	Third
2026	$1,000,000	Leap To Fame	Grant Dixon	Grant Dixon	2:34.5	Akuta	Swayzee
2025	$1,000,000	Leap To Fame	Grant Dixon	Grant Dixon	2:33.55	Chase A Dream	Merlin
2024	$1,000,000	Merlin	Zachary Butcher	Barry Purdon & Scott Phelan	2:35.10	Don't Stop Dreaming	Kango
2023	$1,000,000	Copy That	Blair Orange	Ray Green	2:36.3	Old Town Road	Self Assured
2022	$862,500	Self Assured	Mark Purdon	Mark Purdon & Hayden Cullen	2:37.5	Majestic Cruiser	Spankem

== Other major New Zealand and Australian harness races ==
- Auckland Trotting Cup
- Dominion (harness race)
- Hunter Cup
- Inter Dominion Pacing Championship
- Inter Dominion Trotting Championship
- Miracle Mile Pace
- New Zealand Trotting Cup
- New Zealand Free For All
- Rowe Cup
- Victoria Cup (harness race)

== See also ==
- Harness racing
- Harness racing in New Zealand
