= Gold Ace =

New Zealand Standardbred racehorse

- Breed: Standardbred
- Sire: Bettor's Delight
- Dam: Hill of Gold
- Sex: Colt
- Foaled: 7 December 2007
- Country: New Zealand
- Color: Dark Bay
- Breeder: Derek Moore
- Trainer: Steven Reid

Earnings
- NZ$ 1,247,053
- Last updated on: 10 December 2017.

Gold Ace (foaled 7 December 2007) is a New Zealand Standardbred racehorse.

Gold Ace was by champion sire Bettor's Delight, out of an In The Pocket mare, Hill of Gold. Hill of Gold retired from racing at the age of five, after fracturing her pedal bone.

== Racing career ==
Gold Ace was trained by, and part-owned by Steven Reid. Steven Reid and Graeme Rogerson purchased Gold Ace in 2009 for $27,000.

He was a champion 3-year-old in 2011 and 2012, winning 10 of his 15 races including the New Zealand Derby.

Gold Ace’s earnings topped $1.2m, with 22 wins in 69 starts. His fastest time for 1600m was 1:51.8, run at the Cambridge Raceway.

== Race results ==
Notable performances by Gold Ace include:

Placing	Year	Race	1st	2nd	3rd
1st	2010	Sire Stakes Final	Gold Ace	Hands Christian	The Muskeg Express
1st	2011	New Zealand Derby	Gold Ace	Terror to Love	Major Mark
1st	2011	Golden Nugget (Gloucester Park, Perth)	Gold Ace	Mustang Mach	Eliminator
1st	2012	New Zealand Free For All	Gold Ace	Pure Power	Terror to Love
3rd	2014	A G Hunter Cup	Christen Me	Caribbean Blaster	Gold Ace

== Stud career ==
After retiring from racing in 2015 Gold Ace commenced a stud career at Nevele R Stud in Canterbury. At about the beginning of 2021, Gold Ace moved to stand at Ross Cameron's property at Coes Ford, south of Christchurch.

His progeny include:

- Annerie (out of Feyonce, dam sire Changeover), winner of the Group Three Tasmanian Oaks who then went to North America
- Charlie’s Ace (Jennifer Capriati by Courage Under Fire)
- Distinguished Taste (Art Buyer by Art Major)
- Dressed In Gold (Lite Polaris by Badlands Hanover)
- Max Power (Piccadily Ellen by Art Colony)
- Pixie (Pixel by Holmes Hanover)
- Renko (Jewelz by Changeover)
- Takingcareofbusiness (Booming Jet by Jereme's Jet)
- White Diamond Gold (Redback Jars by Falcon's Idol)

== See also ==
- Harness racing in New Zealand
