= Blossom Lady =

New Zealand Standardbred racehorse

- Breed: Standardbred
- Discipline: Pacing
- Sire: Farm Timer (USA)
- Grandsire: Race Time
- Dam: Lumber Lady
- Maternal grandsire: Lumber Dream (USA)
- Sex: Mare
- Foaled: 11 December 1984
- Country: New Zealand
- Breeder: Bob Davison and Bill Cook, Ashburton
- Owner: Polly Syndicate (Ralph Kermode et al)
- Trainer: (1) Stephen Doody, Palmerston North (2) Derek Jones, Templeton

Record
- 155:43-20-18

Earnings
- $1,334,808

Major wins
- 1992 New Zealand Trotting Cup; 1992 New Zealand Free For All; 1994 A G Hunter Cup; 1995 A G Hunter Cup

Honors
- New Zealand Horse of the Year
- Last updated on: 6 November 2021.

Blossom Lady was a leading New Zealand Standardbred racehorse. Affectionately known as "The Bloss" she is most noted for winning the 1992 New Zealand Trotting Cup and New Zealand Free-For-All double. She also won the 1994 and 1995 A G Hunter Cup in Melbourne, Victoria and in total she won eight Group 1 races.

She was crowned New Zealand Horse of the Year in 1993.

Her owners were the Polly Syndicate comprising Ralph & Judy, Bill & Robyn Kermode, Pat & Mary Foley, Bob & Barbara Williams, Ian & Jenny Smith and Ross & Adrienne Kennedy. The majority of her owners were based in Palmerston North and she was initially trained there by Stephen Doody but after 6 wins (at Manawatu and Cheviot), she was moved to Derek Jones at Templeton near Christchurch. She was driven in the majority of her victories by Anthony Butt, grandson of trainer Derek Jones. Derek himself drove her in one win and his son Peter Jones drove her to two wins. Stephen Doody drove her to five of her six wins when he trained her at Palmerston North.

She was known and admired for her stamina and her long career, she raced in six New Zealand Cups and won races at five separate Inter Dominion Pacing Championship carnivals. She also won the New Zealand Standardbred Breeders Stakes three times.

When she was retired she was the leading stake-winning mare in Australasia.

Her son, Mister D G, foaled 7 December 1997 (Camtastic, USA) was also a top class race-horse who won 20 races including six in Australia. He won the 2004 A G Hunter Cup that his mother had won twice.

Blossom Lady died on 18 May 2004.

She was inducted into the New Zealand Trotting Hall of Fame and the Addington Harness Hall of Fame. She also had a Lounge named after her at Addington Raceway.

== Racing career ==
Blossom Lady's notable performances included:

Year	Placing	Race	1st	2nd	3rd
1990	1st	Hannon Memorial	Blossom Lady	Bold Sharvid	Balonne.
1991	1st	New Zealand Standardbred Breeders Stakes	Blossom Lady	Wreleys	Lady Bonnie
1991	1st	Inter Dominion Pacing Championship Consolation (Auckland)	Blossom Lady	Tight Connection	Thorate
1991	1st	Invercargill Cup	Blossom Lady	Tartan Clansman	Strietross
1991	1st	Easter Cup (3200m)	Blossom Lady	Inky Lord	Popsicle
1991	1st	Ashburton Flying Stakes	Blossom Lady	Inky Lord	Clancy
1991	1st	New World Cup (Forbury)	Blossom Lady	Popsicle	Lord Magic
1992	1st	New Zealand Standardbred Breeders Stakes	Blossom Lady	Lady Bonnie	Seaswift Franco
1992	1st	Invercargill Cup	Blossom Lady	Giovanetto	Air Supply
1992	1st	New Zealand Trotting Cup	Blossom Lady	Giovanetto	Christopher Vance
1992	1st	New Zealand Free For All	Blossom Lady	Sogo	Christopher Vance
1993	1st	New Zealand Standardbred Breeders Stakes	Blossom Lady	Lady's Day	Smooth Gretna
1993	1st	Palmerstonian Classic (Manawatu)	Blossom Lady	Pacing Machine	Doctor Vic
1993	1st	New Zealand Mares Championship	Blossom Lady	Lady's Day	Smooth Gretna
1993	1st	Hannon Memorial	Blossom Lady	Master Musician	Tigerish
1994	1st	A G Hunter Cup	Blossom Lady	Christopher Vance	The Unicorn
1994	1st	Speights Cup (Forbury)	Blossom Lady	Pay Me Back	Light Year
1995	1st	A G Hunter Cup	Blossom Lady	Master Musician	Golden Reign

== See also ==
- Harness racing in New Zealand
