= Preux Chevalier =

Australian Standardbred racehorse

- Breed: Standardbred
- Sire: Lumber Dream
- Grandsire: Knight Dream
- Dam: Heather Frost
- Damsire: Thurber Frost
- Sex: Stallion
- Foaled: 13 September 1978
- Died: 2 June 2007
- Country: Australia
- Colour: Bay
- Breeder: RA & AE Adam
- Owner: Ken & Wendy Lavin
- Trainer: Barry Perkins
- Record: 56:41-7-3
- Earnings: $791,331

Major wins
- Western Australian Pacing Cup (1984); Winfield Cup (1984); Miracle Mile Pace (1985); A G Hunter Cup (1985); Inter Dominion Pacing Championship (1985); JPS Championship (1985); New Zealand Free For All (1985)

Awards
- Australian Harness Horse of the Year (1984-85); Australian Pacers Grand Circuit (1984-85)

Honours
- Western Australian Racing Industry Hall of Fame
- Last updated on 2016-01-25

Preux Chevalier (13 September 1978 – 2 June 2007) was a pacer (racing horse) foaled in New Zealand but notable for his racing successes in Australia in 1984 and 1985 including wins in the Inter Dominion Pacing Championship, Miracle Mile Pace and A G Hunter Cup.

== Early life ==
Preux Chevalier barely attracted a bid at auction before selling privately for $5,000. Commencing racing at age three, Preux Chevalier fractured a cannon bone when not finishing the Western Australian Pacers Derby in 1982. He returned to the track as a four year old in 1982–83 winning seven of nine starts. He was third in the Golden Nugget in February 1983 behind Classic Garry and Wondai’s Mate. Preux Chevalier's first feature win came during the season which was the 4-year-old leg of the Western Australian Triple Crown.

== 1983–84 season ==
Preux Chevalier won the Western Australian 4 & 5 Year Old Championship at Gloucester Park amid a series of consecutive wins early in the 1983–84 season. After winning a heat of the Western Australian Pacing Cup he won a sprint race at Gloucester Park defeating New Zealand Trotting Cup winner Steel Jaw, Gammalite and Black Irish for a twelfth consecutive race win. Preux Chevalier then won the Western Australian Pacing Cup. It was a stunning victory with a mile rating of 1:56.9 over 2275 metres. Preux Chevalier and Steel Jaw ran the first 800m in 57.4 seconds trapping Gammalite wide on the track with Steel Jaw holding the lead. After Steel Jaw tired, Preux Chevalier held off Wondai’s Mate by thee metres with Black Irish third. He established himself as Australia's best pacer in breaking the previous track record of 1.59.3 and recording the fastest mile rate in Australia for a distance longer than one mile. Preux Chevalier then made his first interstate appearance in the Miracle Mile Pace at Harold Park. Starting favourite at 8/11 Preux Chevalier finished last of the six starters. That was his last start for the season.

== 1984–85 season ==
Preux Chevalier began the 1984-85 season by winning six races in succession in Perth. Then at Moonee Valley in Melbourne he won the Winfield Cup beating Panyan by 8 metres with Wondai’s Mate third. Back in Perth he was the 2/7 favourite in the Western Australian Pacing Cup however he was defeated by Village Kid. Returning to Sydney for the 1985 Miracle Mile Pace, Preux Chevalier made amends for his defeat from the previous year winning effortlessly in 1.56.7 which was a race record winning by 9 metres from Paleface Bubble with a further 3 ½ metres to Wondai’s Mate. His next start, also in Sydney, was a dead heat with Paleface Bubble in the Harold Park Cup.

At Moonee Valley he won the A G Hunter Cup after setting a fast pace he defeated Wondai’s Mate by 23 metres with Panyan third. The mile rate of 1.58.5 for 2870 metres broke the track record set by Popular Alm in the 1983 running of the race. Preux Chevalier led throughout recording one of the easiest wins seen in a feature event. The Inter Dominion was contested at Moonee Valley in 1985 and Preux Chevalier began the series by easily winning on the first night. On The second night he won by only 2½ metres from Victorian pacer Quite Famous but recorded a track record mile rate of 1.56.7 for the 1970 metres distance. He then beat Village Kid on the third night. The Inter Dominion final was run before the largest crowd at a meeting at Moonee Valley since the early 1970s. Preux Chevalier required a pre-race veterinary examination after appearing unwell but in the race he took the lead from Village Kid after one lap and held him off by two metres at the finish. The race was also notable as the last start for Gammalite. He became the first horse to have won the Winfield Cup, Miracle Mile Pace, A G Hunter Cup and Inter Dominion. For the season he had 21 starts for 18 wins and 3 seconds. He was Australian Harness Horse of the Year and Australian Pacers Grand Circuit champion.

== 1985–86 season ==
Preux Chevalier had raced in Perth during the winter before starting in Melbourne where he broke the track record at Moonee Valley for 1900 metres winning in a mile rate of 1.57.8. In Brisbane he then won the JPS Championship running a mile in 1.54.3 which was a record for a race mile for Australia and New Zealand breaking the record held by Popular Alm. Preux Chevalier then raced in New Zealand where he finished fourth in the New Zealand Trotting Cup behind outsider Borana. He then redeemed himself winning the New Zealand Free For All by four lengths after a fast early pace. After a second place in the Travelodge FFA Preux Chevalier was then retired to stud due to injury. He raced 53 times in Australia for 40 wins 6 seconds and 3 thirds and a further 3 times in New Zealand for 1 win and 1 second and stakes earnings of $791.331. He died on 2 June 2007 after suffering colic.
