= Robalan =

New Zealand Standardbred racehorse

- Breed: Standardbred
- Sire: Lumber Dream (NZ)
- Grandsire: Knight Dream (US)
- Dam: Elsinor (NZ)
- Maternal grandsire: U Scott (US)
- Sex: Gelding
- Foaled: 1967
- Country: New Zealand
- Colour: Bay
- Breeder: Bill Denton's Russley Lodge (NZ)
- Owner: A T Devery, Peter N Hope, Denis Nyhan (NZ)
- Trainer: Denis Nyhan (NZ)

Record
- 43 wins, 37 places

Earnings
- NZ$176,773

Major wins
- 1971 Wellington Cup; 1974 New Zealand Cup; 1972 New Zealand Free For All; 1973 New Zealand Free For All; 1974 New Zealand Free For All

Awards
- 1973-1974 Harness Horse of the Year
- Last updated on: 2009-04-17.

Robalan was a champion New Zealand pacer Standardbred horse, known as "Robby". He is notable in that he won the 1974 NZ Trotting Cup, the richest harness race in New Zealand, and for his epic contests with champion pacer Young Quinn who he more than often beat and is particularly well remembered for being a free legged pacer.

He won the New Zealand Cup in 1974 over 3200 meters beating the hot favorite Young Quinn. He had the distinction of racing without hopples (free legged pacer) and was known for his phenomenal turn of speed.

He also won the prestigious sprint, the New Zealand Free For All three years in a row, breaking the world record in 1974 with a time of 2:26.6 for the 2000m mobile.

At the age of eight, in 1974, he was in a purple patch of form, winning six in a row. These efforts propelled him into being named Horse of the Year.

== Notable performances ==
- 2nd in the 1972 Kaikoura Cup behind Royal Belmer with Lightsey 3rd
- 3rd in the 1972 New Zealand Trotting Cup behind Globe Bay and Scottish Charm
- 1st in the 1972 New Zealand Free For All beating Globe Bay and Scottish Charm
- 2nd in the 1973 Kaikoura Cup behind Royal Ascot with Hi Foyle 3rd
- 4th in the 1973 New Zealand Trotting Cup behind Arapaho, Globe Bay and Young Quinn
- 1st in the 1973 New Zealand Free For All beating Arapaho and Bomber Bill
- 1st in the 1974 Wellington Cup beating Young Quinn and Hi Foyle
- 1st in the 1974 New Zealand Trotting Cup beating Kotare Legend and Young Quinn
- 1st in the 1974 New Zealand Free For All beating Hi Foyle and Young Quinn
- 2nd in the 1974 Auckland Trotting Cup behind Young Quinn with Hi Foyle 3rd
- 1st in the 1975 Easter Cup (off 35m) beating Lunar Chance and David Garrison
- 3rd in the 1975 New Zealand Trotting Cup behind Lunar Chance and Final Decision

== See also ==
- Harness racing in New Zealand
