= Swayzee (horse) =

Australian Standardbred racehorse

- Breed: Standardbred
- Sire: Rock N Roll Heaven (USA)
- Grandsire: Rocknroll Hanover (USA)
- Dam: Lettucereason
- Maternal grandsire: Art Major (USA)
- Sex: Gelding
- Foaled: 23 September 2017 (age 9)
- Country: Australia
- Trainer: Jason Grimson
- Last updated on: 15 February 2025.

Swayzee (foaled 23 September 2017) is an Australian Standardbred racehorse, notable for winning the:

- 2023 and 2024 New Zealand Trotting Cup
- 2023 Blacks A Fake Queensland Championship
- 2024 Victoria Cup
- 2025 and 2026 A G Hunter Cup.

== Breeding ==
Swayzee was bred by Paul Kahlefeldt at Redbank Lodge Standardbreds in Wagga Wagga, New South Wales. Initially trained by Tim Butt for limited success, he moved to the stable of Jason Grimson at Menangle, Sydney, New South Wales in 2023. He is owned by Boots Properties Racing Pty Ltd, L F Drake, N H Jackson and Jason Grimson.

He is a half brother to another champion standardbred racehorse Leap To Fame. They were sired by different USA stallions: Leap To Fame by Bettor's Delight, but both were out of the dam Lettucereason (Art Major, USA). Leap To Fame was also bred by Redbank Lodge Standardbreds. Lettucereason, who won 17 races, is a sister to the 2013 Victoria Cup winner For A Reason

== Racing career ==
In a sign of things to come, Swayzee's first race was the Buy a Woodlands Stud Weanling Pace for 2-year old pacers over a mile at Tabcorp Park, Menangle, on 21 April 2020 which he won easily by 14 lengths.

He could only manage 7th in his first Group 1 race, the VHRC Caduceus Breeders Crown Series at Melton on 21 November 2020 which was won by Major Moth from Act Now. He was also unsuccessful in two other Group races for three-year old horses the following year. However, in mid 2023 after shifting to the stable of Jason Grimson, he embarked on a run of 10 wins including the Group 1 Blacks A Fake Queensland Championship and New Zealand Trotting Cup. The following year he was to lose that Queensland Championship to his main rival and younger half-brother, Leap To Fame.

Swayzee has only had two race-day starts in New Zealand and notably they are both wins in New Zealand's greatest race.

=== Notable performances ===
Placing	Date	Race	Track	Driver	1st	2nd	3rd
1st	28 May 2023	L - Goulburn Cup	Goulburn	Cameron Hart	Swayzee	Alta Orlando	Ardens Ace
1st	8 July 2023	G3 - Mr Feelgood Open Pace	Albion Park	Cameron Hart	Swayzee	Petes Said So	Manila Playboy
1st	22 July 2023	G1 - The Blacks A Fake Queensland Championship	Albion Park	Cameron Hart	Swayzee	Leap To Fame	Hot And Treacherous
1st	14 November 2023	G1 - New Zealand Trotting Cup	Addington	Cameron Hart	Swayzee	Akuta	Beach Ball
1st	1 December 2023	Inter Dominion Heat	Albion Park	Cameron Hart	Swayzee	Manila Playboy	Turn It Up
3rd	5 December 2023	Inter Dominion Heat	Albion Park	Cameron Hart	Speak The Truth	Petes Said So	Swayzee
4th	9 December 2023	Inter Dominion Heat	Albion Park	Cameron Hart	Better Eclipse	Classie Washington	Kanena Provlima
3rd	16 December 2023	G1 - Inter Dominion Final	Albion Park	Cameron Hart	Leap To Fame	Better Eclipse	Swayzee
2nd	13 July 2024	G2 - Mr Feelgood Open	Albion Park	Cameron Hart	Leap To Fame	Swayzee	Simply Sam
2nd	27 July 2024	G1 - The Blacks A Fake Queensland Championship	Albion Park	Cameron Hart	Leap To Fame	Swayzee	Hector
1st	12 October 2024	G1 - Victoria Cup	Melton	Cameron Hart	Swayzee	Curly James	Mach Dan
1st	12 November 2024	G1 - New Zealand Trotting Cup	Addington	Cameron Hart	Swayzee	Don't Stop Dreaming	Republican Party
1st	26 December 2024	G3 - Shirley Turnbull Memorial	Bathurst	Cameron Hart	Swayzee	Smooth Buzz	Kanena Provlima
1st	1 February 2025	G1 - A G Hunter Cup	Melton	Cameron Hart	Swayzee	Leap To Fame	Republican Party
1st	1 March 2025	G2 - Cordina Group Sprint	Menangle	Cameron Hart	Swayzee	Tact McLeod	Captain Ravishing
4th	8 March 2025	G1 - Miracle Mile Pace	Menangle	Cameron Hart	Don Hugo	Leap To Fame	Tact McLeod
1st	15 March 2025	G3 - Renshaw Cup	Penrith	Cameron Hart	Swayzee	Cya Art	Chevron Art
1st	2 January 2026	Goulburn Cup	Goulburn	Jason Grimson	Swayzee	Don Hugo	Donegal Luther
1st	14 February 2026	G1 - A G Hunter Cup	Melton	Cameron Hart	Swayzee	Leap To Fame	Republican Party
4th	14 March 2026	G1 - Miracle Mile Pace	Menangle	Cameron Hart	Leap To Fame	The Janitor	Don Hugo
3rd	10 April 2026	L - The Race by Sport Nation mobile pace	Cambridge	Cameron Hart	Leap To Fame	Akuta	Swayzee
3rd	24 April 2026	G1 - Noel J Taylor Memorial Mile	Alexandra Park	Cameron Hart	The Lazarus Effect	Got The Chocolates	Swayzee
3rd	8 May 2026	G1 - New Zealand Messenger Championship	Alexandra Park	Cameron Hart	Got The Chocolates	The Lazarus Effect	Swayzee
4th	10 November 2026	G1 - New Zealand Trotting Cup	Addington	Cameron Hart	Leap To Fame	Marketplace	Tact McLeod

== See also ==
- Harness racing in Australia
- Harness racing in New Zealand
