= Leap To Fame =

Australian Standardbred racehorse

- Breed: Standardbred
- Sire: Bettor's Delight (USA)
- Grandsire: Cam's Card Shark (USA)
- Dam: Lettucereason (Aus)
- Maternal grandsire: Art Major (USA)
- Sex: Stallion
- Foaled: 5 November 2018 (age 8)
- Country: Australia
- Trainer: Grant Dixon

Awards
- Australian Harness Horse of the Year (2023, 2024, 2025)
- Last updated on: 11 November 2026.

Leap To Fame (foaled 5 November 2018) is an Australian Standardbred racehorse, notable for winning multiple Group 1 races including the:

- 2023 and 2025 Inter Dominion Pacing Championship
- 2024 A G Hunter Cup
- 2024 and 2026 Miracle Mile Pace
- 2026 New Zealand Trotting Cup
- 2025 New Zealand Free For All
- 2025 and 2026 The Race by Sport Nation mobile pace
- 2022 Victoria Derby (harness).

== Background ==
Owned by Kevin and Kay Seymour through Solid Earth Pty Ltd, Leap To Fame is a half brother to another champion standardbred racehorse Swayzee. They were sired by different USA stallions, Swayzee is by Rock N Roll Heaven, but both were out of the dam Lettucereason (Art Major, USA). Leap To Fame and Swayzee were both bred by Redbank Lodge Standardbreds.

Lettucereason, who won 17 races, is a sister to the 2013 Victoria Cup winner For A Reason

Leap To Fame is trained by Queensland trainer, Grant Dixon, who has also driven him in virtually all his races. His stable name is “Larry”.

== Racing career ==
Leap To Fame's first race was the 2021 Changeover 2YO Classic over 1660m at Albion Park, Brisbane, on 27 March 2021 in which he was 2nd 17 lengths behind Dangerzone. Leap To Fame went on to win 8 out of 11 races in his 2YO season. He was 2nd in his Group 2 debut behind Class To The Max in the Australian Pacing Gold Bullion Final for 2YO Colts & Geldings.

In his 3YO season in 2022 he won 9 out of 12 races. This included wins in the Group 1 New South Wales Derby, Queensland Derby, Victoria Derby and NSW Breeders Challenge 3YO Colts & Geldings Final.

In 2023 as a 4YO he won 12 out of 16 races. This included wins in the Group 1 The Rising Sun, Sunshine Sprint and the Inter Dominion Pacing Championship. He was awarded the title of the Australian Harness Horse of the Year in 2023.

In 2024 Leap To Fame won 15 out of 16 races including the Group 1 A G Hunter Cup, Miracle Mile Pace, Sunshine Sprint and Blacks A Fake Queensland Championship. His one miss was a 2nd at Redcliffe in the Group 3 Chris Garrard's Patron's Purse over 2280m when beaten by a head by District Attorney. He was again voted the Australian Harness Horse of the Year. He was also inducted into the Queensland Harness Racing Hall of Fame.

As a 6YO in 2025 he was 2nd in both the A G Hunter Cup and Miracle Mile Pace behind Swayzee and Don Hugo respectively.

Notable performances include:

Placing	Date	Race	Track	Driver	1st	2nd	3rd	Ref.
1st	5 March 2022	G1 - NSW Derby	Menangle	Grant Dixon	Leap To Fame	Major Perry	Hot Deal	
3rd	9 July 2022	G1 - The Rising Sun	Albion Park	Grant Dixon	Ladies In Red	Better Eclipse	Leap To Fame	
1st	23 July 2022	G1 - Queensland Derby	Albion Park	Grant Dixon	Leap To Fame	Cantfindabettorman	Muscle Bart	
1st	8 October 2022	G1 - Victoria Derby	Melton	Grant Dixon	Leap To Fame	Ripp	Interest Free	
1st	29 October 2022	G1 - NSW Breeders Challenge 3YO Colts & Geldings Final	Menangle	Grant Dixon	Leap To Fame	My Ultimate Ronnie	Teddy Disco	
1st	8 July 2023	G1 - The Rising Sun	Albion Park	Grant Dixon	Leap To Fame	Rocknroll Hammer	My Ultimate Ronnie	
1st	15 July 2023	G1 - Sunshine Sprint	Albion Park	Grant Dixon	Leap To Fame	Spirit Of St Louis	Hot And Treacherous	
2nd	22 July 2023	G1 - The Blacks A Fake Queensland Championship	Albion Park	Grant Dixon	Swayzee	Leap To Fame	Hot And Treacherous	
2nd	2 September 2023	The TAB Eureka	Menangle	Grant Dixon	Encipher	Leap To Fame	Captain Ravishing	
3rd	14 October 2023	G1 - Victoria Cup	Melton	Grant Dixon	Act Now	Catch A Wave	Leap To Fame	
1st	16 December 2023	G1 - Inter Dominion Pacing Championship	Albion Park	Grant Dixon	Leap To Fame	Better Eclipse	Swayzee	
1st	3 February 2024	G1 - A G Hunter Cup	Melton	Grant Dixon	Leap To Fame	Don't Stop Dreaming	Max Delight	
1st	10 February 2024	G2 - Cranbourne Gold Cup	Cranbourne	Grant Dixon	Leap To Fame	Max Delight	Rakero Rebel	
1st	9 March 2024	G1 - Miracle Mile Pace	Menangle	Grant Dixon	Leap To Fame	Sooner The Bettor	Speak The Truth	
1st	20 July 2024	G1 - Sunshine Sprint	Albion Park	Grant Dixon	Leap To Fame	District Attorney	Hi Manameisjeff	
1st	27 July 2024	G1 - Blacks A Fake Queensland Championship	Albion Park	Grant Dixon	Leap To Fame	Swayzee	Hector	
2nd	1 February 2025	G1 - A G Hunter Cup	Melton	Grant Dixon	Swayzee	Leap To Fame	Republican Party	
1st	8 February 2025	G2 - Cranbourne Gold Cup	Cranbourne	Grant Dixon	Leap To Fame	Dont Stop Dreaming	Tact McLeod	
2nd	8 March 2025	G1 - Miracle Mile Pace	Menangle	Grant Dixon	Don Hugo	Leap To Fame	Tact McLeod	
1st	4 April 2025	L - The Race by betcha	Cambridge, NZ	Grant Dixon	Leap To Fame	Chase A Dream	Merlin	
1st	19 July 2025	G1 - Inter Dominion Pacing Championship	Albion Park	Grant Dixon	Leap To Fame	Speak The Truth	Cya Art	
3rd	18 October 2025	G1 - Victoria Cup	Melton	Grant Dixon	Kingman	Hi Manameisjeff	Leap To Fame	
2nd	11 November 2025	G1 - New Zealand Trotting Cup	Addington	Grant Dixon	Kingman	Leap To Fame	Merlin	
1st	14 November 2025	G1 - New Zealand Free For All	Addington	Grant Dixon	Leap To Fame	Republican Party	Merlin	
2nd	6 December 2025	G1 - Blacks A Fake Queensland Championship	Albion Park	Grant Dixon	Don Hugo	Leap To Fame	The Janitor	
2nd	17 January 2026	G3 - Shepparton Cup	Shepparton	Grant Dixon	Kingman	Leap To Fame	Our Luciano	
1st	24 January 2026	G2 - Ballarat Cup	Ballarat	Grant Dixon	Leap To Fame	Dee Roe	Forty Love	
1st	31 January 2026	G1 - Cranbourne Gold Cup	Cranbourne	Grant Dixon	Leap To Fame	Kingman	Bulletproof Boy	
1st	7 February 2026	G1 - Kilmore Pacing Cup	Kilmore	Grant Dixon	Leap To Fame	Republican Party	War Dan Buddy	
2nd	14 February 2026	G1 - A G Hunter Cup	Melton	Grant Dixon	Swayzee	Leap To Fame	Republican Party	
1st	7 March 2026	G1 - International Animal Health Sprint	Menangle	Grant Dixon	Leap To Fame	Chase A Dream	Don Hugo	
1st	14 March 2026	G1 - Miracle Mile Pace	Menangle	Grant Dixon	Leap To Fame	The Janitor	Don Hugo	
1st	10 April 2026	L - The Race by Sport Nation	Cambridge	Grant Dixon	Leap To Fame	Akuta	Swayzee	
2nd	18 July 2026	G1 - Inter Dominion Pacing Championship	Albion Park	Grant Dixon	Captains Mistress	Leap To Fame	Nyack	
1st	10 November 2026	G1 - New Zealand Trotting Cup	Addington	Grant Dixon	Leap To Fame	Marketplace	Tact McLeod	
2nd	13 November 2026	G1 - New Zealand Free For All	Addington	Grant Dixon	Captains Mistress	Leap To Fame	Minos	

== See also ==
- Harness racing in Australia
- Harness racing in New Zealand
