= Courage Under Fire (horse) =

New Zealand Standardbred racehorse

- Breed: Standardbred
- Sire: In The Pocket
- Grandsire: Direct Scooter
- Dam: Advance Debra
- Damsire: Vance Hanover
- Sex: Stallion
- Foaled: 1 August 1996
- Died: 29 July 2017
- Country: New Zealand
- Colour: Black
- Breeder: NJ&OW Cockcroft, PM Inkpen
- Owner: Greg Brodie
- Record: 56:41-4-0
- Earnings: $1,485,629

Major wins
- New Zealand Sires Stakes 2yo Final (1998); New Zealand Sires Stakes 3yo Final (1998); Great Northern Derby (1998); New Zealand Derby (1999); Victoria Derby (1999); Australian Derby (1999); New South Wales Derby (1999); Queensland Derby (1999); South Australian Cup (2001); Queensland Pacing Championship (2001); Australian Pacing Championship (2001)

Awards
- New Zealand 2-Year Old Pacer of the Year (1998); New Zealand 3-Year Old Pacer of the Year (1999); New Zealand 4-Year Old Pacer of the Year (2000); Australian 3-Year Old Pacer of the Year (1999)

Honours
- New Zealand Harness Racing Hall of Fame

Courage Under Fire (1 August 1995 – 29 July 2017) was a New Zealand-bred champion Standardbred race horse notable for being undefeated in his first 24 race starts. A diminutive horse, he was known as Mighty Mouse.

== Racing ==
Courage Under Fire was undefeated in both his two- and three-year-old seasons of racing. As a three-year-old he won a record six derbies. In the Australian Derby at Moonee Valley he broke the track record defeating local star Shakamaker.

As an older horse Courage Under Fire was defeated for the first time in a heat of the 2000 Inter Dominion Pacing Championship after winning his first 24 races. After the 2000 Inter Dominion he was relocated from the New Zealand stables of Bruce Negus to Australian trainer Brian Hancock however his career plateaued. He later won the South Australian Cup, Queensland Pacing Championship and Australian Pacing Championship. He was narrowly beaten in the Miracle Mile and Victoria Cup and he won six heats of the Inter Dominion Pacing Championship and was fourth in the final in 2001. In the South Australian Cup at Globe Derby Park in 2001 he set a track record that stood until broken by his son Smolda in 2017. A popular horse, large crowds often surrounded his stall for a glimpse.

Courage Under Fire won 41 of 56 starts and earned $NZ1,551,941 in stakes.

== Notable races ==
- 1st in the 1998 New Zealand Sires Stakes 2yo Final beating Cigar and Revonez
- 1st in the 1998 New Zealand Sires Stakes 3yo Final beating Smart Holmes and Cigar
- 1st in the 1998 Great Northern Derby beating Cigar and Stevies
- 1st in the 1999 New Zealand Derby beating Colonel Anvil and Waitaki Warrior
- 1st in the 1999 Victoria Derby beating Luke Of Earl and Chairman Whitby
- 1st in the 1999 Australian Derby beating Revonez and Shakamaker
- 1st in the 1999 New South Wales Derby beating Just Okay and Docs Mistake
- 1st in the 1999 Queensland Derby beating My Way Of Thinking and Bronski Warrior
- 2nd in Heat 2 of the 2000 Inter Dominions (Moonee Valley) behind Kyema Kid with OK Oskar 3rd
- 1st in Heat 7 of the 2000 Inter Dominions beating Luke Of Earl and Kyema Kid
- 1st in Heat 2 of the 2001 Inter Dominions (Albion Park) beating Yulestar and Safe And Sound
- 1st in Heat 9 of the Inter Dominions beating Breenys Fella and Lombo Rapida
- 4th in the 2001 Inter Dominion Grand Final behind Yulestar, Atitagain and Pocket Me
- 1st in the 2001 South Australian Cup beating Breenys Fella and Friends For Life
- 1st in the 2001 Queensland Pacing Championship beating Shakamaker and Rare Fuel
- 1st in the 2001 Australian Pacing Championship beating Shakamaker and Double Identity
- 2nd in the 2001 Miracle Mile Pace behind Smooth Satin with Yulestar 3rd
- 2nd equal in the 2002 Victoria Cup behind Jofess, dead-heated with Safe And Sound with Yulestar 4th

== Stud career ==
At stud he sired more than 400 winners in New Zealand and more than 300 winners in Australia including Inter Dominion Pacing Championship winner Smolda and was expected to serve a full book of mares in the 2017–18 breeding season.

He died at Yirribee Stud near Wagga Wagga, New South Wales after being purchased by Yirribee in July 2017.

== See also ==
- Harness racing in Australia
- Harness racing in New Zealand
