= Elsu =

New Zealand Standardbred racehorse (1999–2023)

Elsu (19 December 1999 – July 2023) was a New Zealand-bred black Standardbred pacer who was the 2005 Australasian Pacers Grand Circuit champion and was the New Zealand Horse of the Year in the 2003/04 and 2004/05 seasons.

Elsu was sired by Falcon Seelster out of Interchange by New York Motoring.

== Racing record ==
Elsu was born on 19 December 1999. He was trained by Geoff Small and driven by David Butcher.

In 2002/2003, Elsu won the Great Northern Derby, the NZ Yearling Sales Series Open, the New Zealand Trotting Derby and the New South Wales Derby. During his career he also won the 2003 and 2004 Auckland Pacing Cups, the Chariots of Fire, the Noel J Taylor Memorial Mile, the New Zealand Messenger Championship, the A.G. Hunter Cup, the Inter-Dominion Pacing Championship and the City of Auckland Free For All. The 2004/2005 season saw Elsu crowned the Australasian Pacers Grand Circuit Champion, as well as being crowned New Zealand Harness Horse of the Year for the second time.

Elsu was also placed second in the New Zealand Trotting Cup in 2003 and 2004, beaten in both races by Just An Excuse.

Elsu's performance in the 2005 A.G. Hunter Cup was a remarkable effort in the world's richest standing start event, handicapped 20 metres, Elsu sat 3 wide for the last 1,100 metres then powered to the line to easily win. It was later found that he was suffering from leg injuries at the time. His best time for the mile was 1:53.6.

Elsu was retired to stud in 2005 with over two million dollars in earnings. His stud career began well with a full book. He died in July 2023, at the age of 23.

=== Major race wins ===
- 2002 Great Northern Derby beating Bella’s Boy and Blair John.
- 2003 New Zealand Trotting Derby beating Light And Sound and Howard Bromac.
- 2003 New South Wales Derby beating Camlach and Apollo Red.
- 2003 Auckland Pacing Cup beating Just An Excuse and Holmes DG.
- 2004 Noel Taylor Mile beating London Legend and Miracle Man.
- 2004 Auckland Pacing Cup beating Oscar Wild and Howard Bromac.
- 2004 Chariots of Fire beating Napoleon and The Warp Drive.
- 2005 A G Hunter Cup (Handicap of 20 metres) beating Flashing Red and Howard Bromac.
- 2005 Inter Dominion Pacing Championship beating Sly Flyin and Just An Excuse.

== Pedigree ==
Pedigree of Elsu, black stallion, 1999
Sire Falcon Seelster (USA) B. 1982	Warm Breeze; B. 1973	Bret Hanover	Adios
Sire Falcon Seelster (USA) B. 1982	Warm Breeze; B. 1973	Bret Hanover	Brenna Hanover
Sire Falcon Seelster (USA) B. 1982	Warm Breeze; B. 1973	Touch of Spring	Good Time
Sire Falcon Seelster (USA) B. 1982	Warm Breeze; B. 1973	Touch of Spring	Breath O'Spring
Sire Falcon Seelster (USA) B. 1982	Fashion Trick; B. 1972	Overtrick	Solicitor
Sire Falcon Seelster (USA) B. 1982	Fashion Trick; B. 1972	Overtrick	Overbid
Sire Falcon Seelster (USA) B. 1982	Fashion Trick; B. 1972	Meadow Child	Adios Butler
Sire Falcon Seelster (USA) B. 1982	Fashion Trick; B. 1972	Meadow Child	Midway Lady
Dam Interchange (NZ) Br. 1986	New York Motoring (USA); B. 1978	Most Happy Fella	Meadow Skipper
Dam Interchange (NZ) Br. 1986	New York Motoring (USA); B. 1978	Most Happy Fella	Laughing Girl
Dam Interchange (NZ) Br. 1986	New York Motoring (USA); B. 1978	Peaches N Cream	Shadow Wave
Dam Interchange (NZ) Br. 1986	New York Motoring (USA); B. 1978	Peaches N Cream	Parisian Hanover
Dam Interchange (NZ) Br. 1986	Zenover; B. 1968	Bachelor Hanover (USA)	Nibble Hanover
Dam Interchange (NZ) Br. 1986	Zenover; B. 1968	Bachelor Hanover (USA)	The Old Maid
Dam Interchange (NZ) Br. 1986	Zenover; B. 1968	Zenith	U.Scott (USA)
Dam Interchange (NZ) Br. 1986	Zenover; B. 1968	Zenith	Royden Star

== See also ==
- Harness racing in New Zealand
