= Lordship (horse) =

New Zealand Standardbred racehorse

- Breed: Standardbred
- Sire: Johnny Globe (NZ)
- Grandsire: Logan Derby
- Dam: Ladyship (NZ)
- Maternal grandsire: U Scott (USA)
- Sex: Stallion
- Foaled: 1 September 1958
- Country: New Zealand
- Colour: Black
- Breeder: D G Nyhan & M A Haslett (NZ)
- Owner: D G Nyhan
- Trainer: D G Nyhan

Earnings
- $113,790

Major wins
- New Zealand Derby (1961); New Zealand Trotting Cup (1962 & 1966); New Zealand Free For All (1962, 1964 & 1967); Auckland Pacing Cup (1964); Easter Cup (1964 & 1966)

Honours
- Leading Standardbred Sire in New Zealand (1980); New Zealand Trotting Hall of Fame
- Last updated on: 14 March 2016.

Lordship was a New Zealand–bred Standardbred pacer. He won two New Zealand Trotting Cup races. He won 45 races and as a leading sire, he sustained the Globe Derby sireline through his successful sons.

Lordship was bred and owned by Mrs Doris Nyhan and trained by her husband Don Nyhan and driven by their son Denis Nyhan in most of his major victories.

In 1962, as a four-year-old, he beat the great champion racehorse Cardigan Bay in the New Zealand Trotting Cup on a rain-affected track. He was a bit of a mudlark and won the 1966 version of the Cup, again on a wet track.

== Racing record ==
He won the following major races:

- 1962 Ashburton Flying Stakes Handicap, beating Gildirect and Grouse.
- 1962 New Zealand Trotting Cup, beating Falsehood and Blue Prince. Cardigan Bay could only manage 5th.
- 1962 New Zealand Free For All, beating Cardigan Bay and Jay Ar.
- 1964 New Zealand Free For All, beating Orbiter and Jay Ar.
- 1964 Auckland Pacing Cup, beating Jay Ar and Great Adios.
- 1966 New Zealand Trotting Cup, off 42 yards, beating Robin Dundee and Waitaki Hanover.
- 1967 New Zealand Free For All, beating Allakasam and Indecision.

He was also a successful sire, leaving Lord Module and Inky Lord.

== See also ==
- Harness racing in New Zealand
