= TAB Eureka =

The TAB Eureka
- Location: Tabcorp Park Menangle, New South Wales
- Inaugurated: 2023
- Race type: Standardbred - Flat racing
- Website: https://www.theeureka.com.au/

Race information
- Distance: 2300m
- Qualification: 3 and 4 year old pacers
- Purse: Aus $1,980,000 (2025)

The TAB Eureka is a race for 3 and 4 year old and older harness horses run at Tabcorp Park Menangle, New South Wales, in September each year. It is the world's richest harness race and is raced over 2300m from a mobile start.

== Conditions of the race ==
It is a slot race. This involves each potential race entry (slot) being sold to a purchaser (slot holder) who secures a spot in the race for three years. These slots are sold as licenses, with the slot owner entitled to start whichever horse they wish into the race, provided it is eligible. The initial slots were sold for $300,000 each up front ($100,000 per year for three years) and there are 10 slots in a race.

The slot holder does not have to own or lease the horse they start in the race. Instead they may liaise with the trainers and owners of high quality racehorses that may potentially fill the slot and contest the race. The horses must be Australian bred. The slot holders will enter into independent arrangements with the horse owners/trainers in regards the distribution of any prize money won. Slot holders can nominate the horse starting in their slot anytime up until 7 days prior to the race.

It has a preferential draw for the horses based on their age and sex.

In the event that a slot owner's horse cannot make the race or is a late scratching there is a number of available replacement horses (emergencies) selected by a panel of experts independent of the slot holders and released following the closure of the nomination timeframe. These horses are selected taking into account their race form and allocated in order that they must be taken in the event of a late scratching.

The Australian TAB have been allocated 1 slot as part of their naming rights partnership of the race, leaving 9 slots available for other purchasers.

Each year, the process of slot holders acquiring horses to enter the race gains considerable interest amongst the racing community.

The TAB Eureka is therefore similar to The Race by betcha a standardbred slot race run in Cambridge, New Zealand and The Everest a thoroughbred slot race held at Randwick Racecourse in Sydney which is the World's richest horse race on turf, with a $20 million prize pool in 2024.

== History ==
The race was first held in 2023 and was run over 2400m. In 2023 the stake of $1,970,000 was divided to $1,000,000 for 1st, $400,000 for 2nd, $200,000 for 3rd and $100,000 for 4th. All other starters received $45,000. The inaugural winner was Encipher, a Victorian-trained South Australian mare running for slot holders Aaron Bain Racing and Summit Bloodstock, who beat the favourite Leap To Fame. Encipher's owner-breeder was Tyson Linke from Kadina, South Australia and trainer was Emma Stewart. It was driven by Luke McCarthy.

The TAB Eureka was changed to a 2300m race in 2024, which was won by Don Hugo, once again driven by Luke McCarthy but also trained by him. Don Hugo was running for slot holder, John Singleton.

== Race results ==
The past winners of the race are as follows:

Year	Stake	Winner	Driver	Trainer(s)	Slot holder(s)	Time	Second	Third
2025	$1,980,000	Bay of Biscay	Cameron Hart	Emma Stewart	Soho Standardbreds	2:41.0 (2300m)	Fox Dan	Hesitate
2024	$1,980,000	Don Hugo	Luke McCarthy	Luke McCarthy	John Singleton	2:42.5 (2300m)	Bay of Biscay	High Above
2023	$1,970,000	Encipher	Luke McCarthy	Emma Stewart, Cardigan	Aaron Bain Racing and Summit Bloodstock	2:46.7 (2400m)	Leap To Fame	Captain Ravishing

== Other major races ==
- Miracle Mile
- Inter Dominion Pacing Championship
- Inter Dominion Trotting Championship
- A G Hunter Cup
- Victoria Cup

== See also ==
- Harness racing
- Harness racing in Australia
