= Australian Pacing Championship =

The Australian Pacing Championship is a harness racing event showcasing some of Australia's and New Zealand’s best pacers. It is currently held annually at Gloucester Park in Perth.

== Results ==
Year	Venue	Stake	Winner	Age	Driver	Distance	Mile Rate
2011	Perth	$125,000	Ima Spicey Lombo (NSW)	5YO	AC Lewis	2,100m	1:56.2
2010	Perth	$125,000	Has The Answers (WA)	7YO	AC Lewis	2,130m	1:56.5
2009	Perth	$125,000	Washakie (NZ)	5YO	GE Hall Jnr	2,130m	1:57.4
2008	Perth	$125,000	Dartmoor (NZ)	6YO	GE Hall Jnr	2,130m	1:57.3
2007	Perth	$200,000	Shardons Aflyin (NZ)	6YO	GL Williams	2,130m	1:57.4
2006	Perth	$125,000	Lookslikelightning (WA)	7YO	R Warwick	2,143m	1:57.7
2005	Perth	$100,000	The Falcon Strike (NZ)	7YO	G.E. Hall Jnr	2,143m	1:57.4
2004	Perth	$100,000	The Falcon Strike (NZ)	6YO	G.E. Hall Jnr	2,140m	1:57.3
2003 (Jan)	Perth	$100,000	Bengeeman** (VIC)	6YO	GE Hall Jnr	2,140m	NTT
2001 (Oct)	Brisbane	$123,750	Courage Under Fire (NZ)	6YO	BP Hancock	2,647m	1:58.7
2000	Brisbane	$122,500	Atitagain (NZ)	7YO	DW Wilson	2,647m	1:57.9
1999	Brisbane	$125,000	Safe And Sound (VIC)	5YO	JD Justice	2,647m	1:57.0
1998	Brisbane	$100,000	Our Sir Vancelot (NZ)	8YO	BP Hancock	2600m	1:59.4
1997	Newcastle	$100,000	Sovereign Hill (NZ)	6YO	DR Hancock	2,550m	1:58.8
1996	Brisbane	$100,000	Rainbow Knight (SA)	5YO	Lisa Justice	2,600m	1:59.3
1995	Sydney	$100,000	Desperate Comment (NZ)	7YO	PN Jones	2565m	2:07.2
1994	Gold Coast	$100,000	Chandon (VIC)	5YO	VW Frost	2,609m	2:00.1
1993	Melbourne	$100,000	Jack Morris (NZ)	6YO	SHR Harney	2,380m	1:59.5
1992	Bankstown	$100,000	Franco Tiger (NZ)	7YO	B.R. Gath	2,540m	2:01.0
1991	Launceston	$125,000	Westburn Grant (NSW)	6YO	VW Frost	2,100m	1:57.3
1990	Sydney	$100,000	Almeta Boy (TAS)	5YO	V.J. Knight	2,350m	1:59.3
1989	Brisbane	$100,000	Earth Station (WA)	6YO	KJ Thomas	2,380m	1:56.9
1988	Melbourne	$150,000	Another Bart (VIC)	4YO	Gavin A Lang	2,380m	1:58.5
1987	Perth	$150,000	Village Kid (NZ)	7YO	AC Lewis	2,500m	1:59.7
1986	Adelaide	$130,000	Swapzee Bromac (NZ)	4YO	T.B. Warwick	2,230m	1:59.9
1985	Melbourne	$90,000	Jack Brandon (NZ)	5YO	PR McCraw	2,380m	1:59.6
1984	Sydney	$80,000	Area Code (NSW)	4YO	VW Frost	2,700m	2:02.1
1983	Brisbane	$80,000	Popular Alm (VIC)	7YO	V.J. Knight	2,600m	2:02.5
1982	Perth	$76,000	Black Irish (NZ)	8YO	A.C. Lewis	2,625m	1:59.9
1981	Sydney	$75,000	Jikk Adios (NSW)	5YO	R.J. Hancock	2,700m	2:04.9
1980	Melbourne	$75,000	Brad Adios (NZ)	5YO	G Morgan	2,400m	2:00.1
1979	Perth	$75,000	Satinover (WA)	5YO	MJ Johnson	2,600m	2:02.6
1978	Brisbane	$50,000	Michael Frost (NSW)	6YO	J Ilsley	2,530m	2:04.1
1977	Adelaide	$50,000	Rip Van Winkle (VIC)	4YO	M Vanderkem	2650m	2:07.5
1976	Sydney	$49,000	Markovina (NZ)	5YO	B.R. Gath	2,700m	2:07.5

- Inquiry conducted by WATA Stewards 17/12/03 and subsequent appeal on 7/7/04 disqualified Backinafalcon from 1st placing.
