= Menangle Park Paceway =

Coordinates: 34°6′10.51″S 150°44′32.50″E

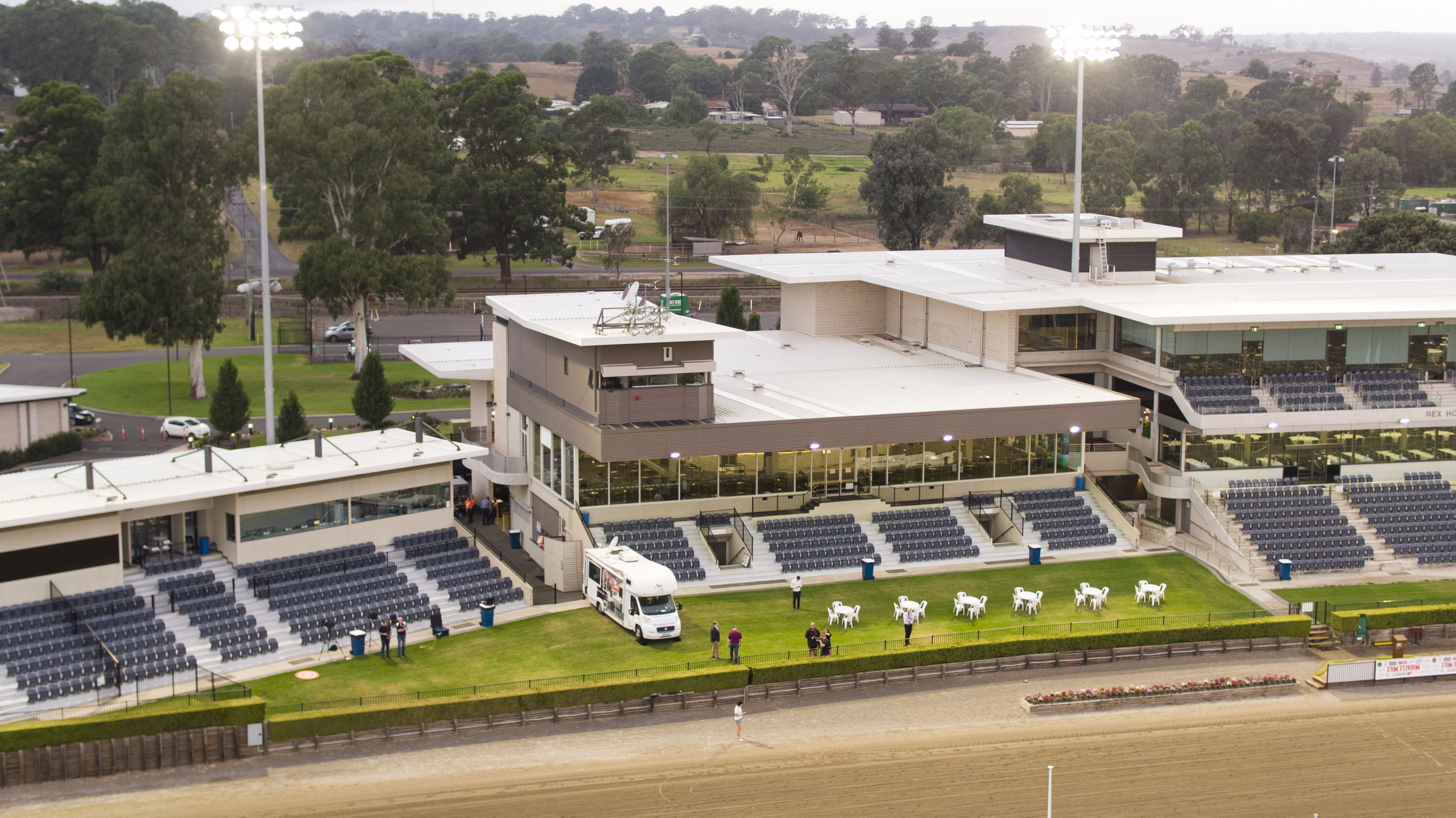
Aerial view of the current track facilities

Menangle Park Paceway, known for sponsorship reasons as Tabcorp Park, Menangle, is a harness racing track operating in Menangle Park, New South Wales, Australia. The New South Wales Harness Racing Club conducts meetings at the Paceway. The New South Wales Harness Racing Club trading as Club Menangle Trackside, is located within the Paceway grounds off Racecourse Avenue. Major extensions to the club at the licensed historic premises previously known as the Horse and Jockey Inn just outside the paceway grounds, opened in September 2019.

== History ==
The Menangle Park Paceway was opened in 1914 and after the outbreak of World War I, it was requisitioned as an army camp used for the Australian Light Horse. The facility was returned to the owners for horse racing, until 18 November 1941, when the racecourse was again taken over by the military during World War II.

The racecourse was converted into a military camp, providing camping and training facilities for Royal Australian Air Force constructed an aerodrome at the site in 1942, which went through the middle of the racecourse, which was known as Menangle Aerodrome. The aerodrome was a satellite aerodrome for RAAF Station Schofields and the runway was 5,000 feet (1,500 m) long and 150 feet (46 m) wide. Seven splinterproof pens and five concealed hideouts were constructed at the aerodrome. The site was also used as an aircraft park for HMS Nabthorpe, a Royal Navy Mobile Operational Naval Air Base, based at Schofields.

_

1820 Menangle House was built about 1820 by George Taber. It still stands today and is heritage lists. It is in the grounds of the new Menangle Country Club on Menangle Road

1913 In September, the final plans for the building of the 'Menangle Park Racecourse', were finalised by the Architect, local A.R. (Alf) Payten

1914 On 6 August, the first Official Race meeting (gallops) was held at the Racecourse. A sprinkling of harness racing meetings was held by the 'Menangle Park Trotting Club'

1917 The racecourse site was commissioned by the Army for World War I. It was the training camp for the Lighthorse and the Camel Corp.

1920 Racing resumed at the racecourse and both thoroughbred and trotting meetings were conducted. Notable thoroughbred, ‘Rogilla’, a Caulfield Cup winner and multiple feature race winner, won his Maiden (first win) race at Menangle Park in 1931.

1943 The racecourse was again commissioned by the Air Force RAAF and Army, this time during World War II. An airstrip was built in the middle of the track. This airstrip was used by Sir Charles Kingsford-Smith in the film ‘Smithy’ that was produced in the late 1940s.

1952 After being dormant for a few years following its use in WWII, the racecourse site was put up for auction for 25,000 pounds by the owner the Menangle Park Racing Company Limited. There were no bidders. Bill Dunlop, the then President of the NSW Trotting Club, then arranged a private purchase.

1953 After extensive work and remodelling, the NSW Trotting Club opened racing on 26 September, at it new 'Out of Town' track. A huge crowd of 5,000 attended the opening, and the new trotting track was officially opened by Governor, Sir William McKell.

1964 Night trotting was introduced to the Menangle Park track on 2 November.

1970s Strong and well patronised harness racing meeting were held at Menangle Park. In 1975 the local Campbelltown Show, that had previous been held for a number of years at the Showground in the centre of town, was moved and was held successful for a number of years at the Menangle Park venue.

1980s Again in this decade harness racing meetings were held at the out of town track. Menangle Park track was also the venue for the Sunday Menangle Markets that were conducted each week for a number of years.

2000 Works commenced to rebuild and change the Menangle Park track from the 800-metre circuit to a new state-of-the-art 1400-metre complex.

2008 After a major facelift, the Menangle Park 1400-metre track was officially opened on 24 June before a strong 8,000 crowd.

2011 Following the closure of Harold Park on 17 December 2010, the NSW Harness Racing Club (now branded as Club Menangle) moved all its operations to the Menangle Park track. It is now the show piece for harness racing in New South Wales.

2021 Menangle Park stages over 100 race meetings per year (twice a week). It is a much sought after venue in the Macarthur region for functions/trade shows and festivals. Club Menangle embraces the local community through many functions and charity drives. Club Menangle is the home of the $2.1million The TAB Eureka, the world's richest harness race and the $1million Garrards Miracle Mile Pace, the Southern Hemisphere's richest sprint race.

=== Units based at Menangle Aerodrome ===
- No. 1 Squadron RAAF
- No. 15 Squadron RAAF
- No. 23 Squadron RAAF
- No. 83 Squadron RAAF
- No. 164 Radar Station RAAF

After the abandonment of Menangle aerodrome, the site was a location for scenes for the 1946 film Smithy based on the historic flight of Charles Kingsford Smith.

== Return to trotting ==
New South Wales Harness Racing Club acquired the site in 1952 and redeveloped the racecourse as a paceway (a racecourse for harness racing), which officially opened on 26 September 1953. The newly reconstructed paceway reopened in 2008 as Tabcorp Park. In 2010 it replaced Harold Park as Sydney's premier harness track. At 1400 metres, it is one of the fastest and largest harness racing circuits in Australia. In 2011, Menanagle saw the first sub 1:50 mile ever run in Australasia, with Smoken Up running 1:48.5 in the Len Smith Mile. Many Australian, Australasian and World records have been set on the track.

The main races held at Menangle Park are the Miracle Mile, New South Wales Derby, New South Wales Oaks, the Len Smith Mile and the TAB Eureka. Menangle has also held the Inter Dominion series:

- 2010: Inter Dominion Pacing Championship only as the trotters raced at Moonee Valley
- 2013: pacers only, there was no Inter Dominion Trotting Championship from 2013 to 2017
- 2014: pacers only
- 2015: pacers only
- 2021: pacers and trotters, the heats were held at Menangle, Bathurst & Newcastle, the finals at Menangle
- 2024: pacers and trotters, the heats were held at Newcastle, Bathurst & Menangle, the finals at Menangle.

Races are usually held on Tuesday afternoons and Saturday nights. Fred Hastings is the Menangle and New South Wales harness lead race caller however Anthony Manton, Matt Jackson, Luke Marlow, Mitch Manners Brandon Kreymborg and Ben Hall have all called at this venue. The venue has a museum.
