= Peter Wolfenden =

New Zealand harness racer (24 January 1935–18 February 2023)

Peter Tom Wolfenden MBE (24 January 1935 – 18 February 2023) was a New Zealand driver and trainer of Standardbred racehorses. He won the New Zealand drivers' premiership 14 times, including eight consecutive years from 1974, and twice won the Australasian Drivers Championship. He represented New Zealand seven times in the World Drivers Championship in harness racing, placing second in 1977 and third in 1971. He had 1762 career race wins in New Zealand as a driver, and 798 as a trainer.

One of his most notable wins was in the 1963 New Zealand Trotting Cup, when he trained and drove New Zealand's top pacer Cardigan Bay.

In the 1982 New Year Honours, Wolfenden was appointed a Member of the Order of the British Empire (MBE), for services to trotting. He was inducted into the New Zealand Sports Hall of Fame.

Wolfenden died on 18 February 2023, at the age of 88.

== Big race wins ==
Peter Wolfenden's career included driving the following winners:

- 1984 Auckland Cup – Enterprise
- 1983 Auckland Cup – Armalight
- 1980 Rowe Cup – Special Pride
- 1979 Inter Dominion Pacing Championship – Rondel
- 1978 Auckland Cup – Sole Command
- 1977 Rowe Cup – Framalda
- 1987 New Zealand Trotting Derby – Motu Prince
- 1977 New Zealand Trotting Cup – Sole Command
- 1974 Great Northern Derby – Captain Harcourt
- 1970 New Zealand Trotting Cup – James
- 1969 Rowe Cup – Special Cash
- 1968 Rowe Cup – Special Cash
- 1966 Great Northern Derby – Governor Frost
- 1965 New Zealand Trotting Cup – Garry Dillon
- 1963 Auckland Cup – Cardigan Bay
- 1963 Inter Dominion Pacing Championship – Cardigan Bay
- 1963 New Zealand Free For All – Cardigan Bay
- 1963 New Zealand Trotting Cup- Cardigan Bay
- 1961 Auckland Cup – Cardigan Bay
- 1961 Great Northern Derby – Waitaki Hanover
- 1961 New Zealand Free For All – Cardigan Bay
- 1960 Auckland Cup – Damian
- 1960 Rowe Cup – Jewel Derby

== See also ==
- Harness racing in New Zealand
