= Lord Module =

New Zealand Standardbred racehorse

- Breed: Standardbred
- Sire: Lordship (USA)
- Grandsire: Johnny Globe (NZ)
- Dam: Module (NZ)
- Maternal grandsire: Bachelor Hanover (USA)
- Sex: Stallion
- Foaled: 9 November 1974
- Died: 8 April 1997 (aged 22)
- Country: New Zealand
- Colour: Bay
- Breeder: Mrs S.M. Porter & P.L. Porter, Timaru
- Trainer: Cecil Devine

Record
- 93: 28-19-14

Earnings
- NZ$261,750

Honours
- Best winning mile rate 1:54.9

Lord Module (9 November 1974 – 8 April 1997) was a champion New Zealand-bred Standardbred racehorse who raced during the 1970s.

He is notable in that he won the New Zealand Trotting Cup, the richest harness race, and sometimes the richest horse race in New Zealand.

A gifted Standardbred racehorse who certainly could have won many more races but for being troubled throughout his career by bad feet and unruly behaviour, which led to his subsequent retirement.

He won the New Zealand cup in 1979 but was banned the following year because of his unruly barrier behaviour. However, in the final race of the carnival and against one of the best fields ever assembled he finished his career in the best possible way, coming from a hopeless position and storming to victory. This completed a treble of races that had only ever been won previously by Cardigan Bay.

The race call by Reon Murtha was remembered word for word by many harness fans such was the emotion generated by the performance. Straight after the race the crowd stormed out of the stands towards the horse. Reon Murtha recalled in an interview (January 2007) how he choked back the tears saying it was the most emotional moment in his 47 years of race calling.

A poll of current reinsman highlighted their greatest ever horses, Lord Module was the only one who featured more than once of any horse mentioned from the 1950s through to the 1980s.

Lord Module won the following major races:

- 1977 NZ 2YO Championship
- 1979 New Zealand Trotting Cup: beating Rocky Tryax and Trevira.
- 1979 New Zealand Free For All, beating Trevira and Trusty Scot
- 1979 Allan Matson Free for All
- 1979 PanAm Mile (invitational), won in 1:56.2 which was the Southern Hemisphere record
- 1980 Allan Matson FFA
- 1980 New Brighton Cup

In 1979 he time trialed over a mile in 1:54.9 (NZ Record).

== See also ==
- Harness racing in New Zealand
