= Young Quinn =

New Zealand Standardbred racehorse

- Breed: Standardbred
- Sire: Young Charles (NZ)
- Grandsire: U Scott (USA)
- Dam: Loyal Trick (NZ)
- Maternal grandsire: Hal Tryax (USA)
- Sex: Gelding
- Foaled: 1969
- Country: New Zealand
- Colour: Bay
- Breeder: R.O. Baynes (NZ)
- Owner: R.O. & D.J. Baynes (NZ)
- Trainer: Charlie Hunter (NZ)

Record
- 133 starts, 59 wins and 36 places

Earnings
- NZ$752,587

Major wins
- 1974 Auckland Pacing Cup; 1975 Miracle Mile Pace; 1975 Inter Dominion Pacing Championship; American Pacing Classic (1975)

Honours
- Best mile rate, 1:55.0
- Last updated on: 29 July 2011.

Young Quinn, a New Zealand standardbred racehorse, was successful in period where his competition in the sport of trotting was particularly strong. Foaled in 1969, he was by Young Charles out of Loyal Trick by Hal Tryax (USA). Named after Brian "Snow" Quinn, a champion New Zealand sheep shearer, he was trained and driven by the great Charles Stewart Hunter (Charlie). He was nicknamed 'Garbage' as a result of his habit of eating anything in sight, as a young horse. It was later revealed by cardiograph tests that Young Quinn's heart weighed 13 lb, only 1 lb less than that of the great racehorse Phar Lap.

== Racing career ==
Young Quinn made 133 starts for 59 wins and 36 placings for NZ$752,587 in stakemoney. His record of beating off strong rivals and big names was noticed by the public, and thus he was sometimes sent out odds on. He raced against many good horses of the time like Arapaho and Robalan.

Notable races in New Zealand included:

- 3rd in the 1973 New Zealand Trotting Cup behind Arapaho and Globe Bay.
- 2nd in the 1973 Auckland Pacing Cup behind Arapaho, with Black Watch 3rd.
- 3rd in the 1974 New Zealand Trotting Cup behind Robalan and Kotare Legend.
- 1st in the 1974 Auckland Pacing Cup beating Robalan and Hi Foyle.

=== Mirace Mile ===
In the 1975 Miracle Mile Pace, Australia's premier mile, at Harold Park, Young Quinn won from barrier six, the outside draw on a very tight track, beating the two acknowledged Australian champions of the time, Paleface Adios and Hondo Grattan.

=== 1975 Inter Dominion ===
The 1975 Inter Dominion was held in Auckland, New Zealand. A strong team of Australian pacers including Hondo Grattan, Paleface Adios, Just Too Good and Royal Gaze, made the trip across the Tasman. He won the three heats and the Pacer's final, beating locals Hi Foyle and Speedy Guest. Starting as a short-priced favourite in the final, he was driven by John Langdon, following the injury to his regular driver and trainer Charlie Hunter. Ironically, Langdon also won the Trotter's section of the Inter Dominion driving the Hunter-trained Castleton's Pride. These two wins gained Langdon a spot on the Inter Dominion Hall of Fame.

=== North America ===
Young Quinn later raced in the United States and Canada with considerable success which included at least one victory over the USA champion of the day, Rambling Willie, until returning to New Zealand in 1980 for a few starts prior to being retired.

== See also ==
- Harness racing
- Harness racing in New Zealand
